= 1770s =

Decade

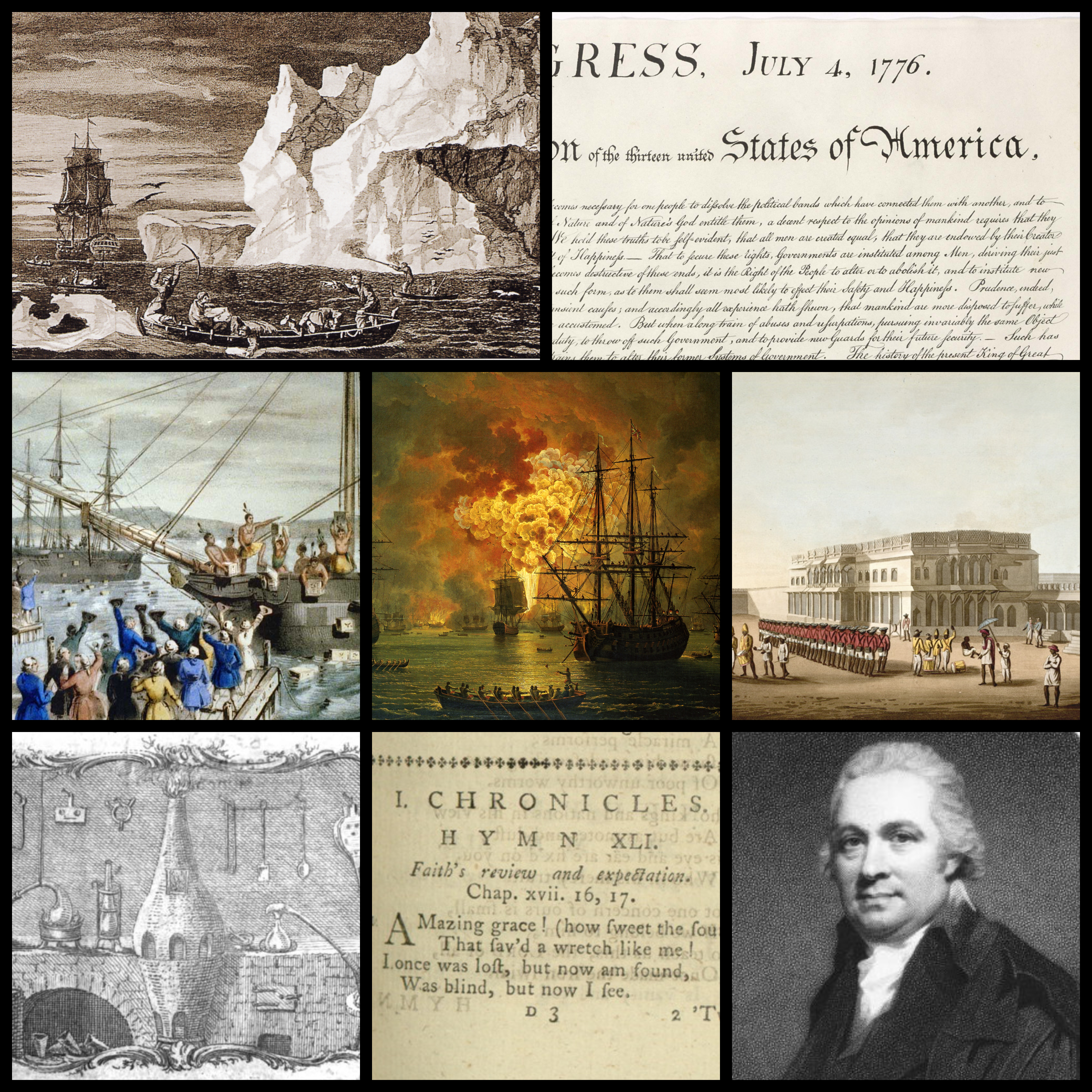
From top left, clockwise: James Cook, whose Pacific voyages continued throughout the decade; the United States Declaration of Independence, adopted by the Second Continental Congress in 1776; Company rule in India; Daniel Rutherford, whose research contributed to the identification of nitrogen; John Newton's hymn later known as Amazing Grace; Carl Wilhelm Scheele, known for his work in chemistry; the Boston Tea Party of 1773; and the Russo-Turkish War of 1768–1774 lead to now-Russia's first occupation of Crimea; initiating Russia's influence over Crimea that has since persisted today.

The 1770s (pronounced "seventeen-seventies") was a decade of the Gregorian calendar that began on January 1, 1770, and ended on December 31, 1779. The decade included significant political, economic, scientific, and exploratory developments in Europe, the Americas, and the Pacific.

In North America, tensions between the Kingdom of Great Britain and the Thirteen Colonies intensified during the decade. The Boston Tea Party took place in 1773, the American Revolutionary War began in 1775, and the Continental Congress adopted the United States Declaration of Independence in 1776. The Declaration was formally adopted on July 4, 1776, while delegates began signing the engrossed copy in August. The decade also coincided with the continuing development of the Industrial Revolution in Britain.

European exploration of the Pacific Ocean continued through the voyages of James Cook. During the 1770s, Cook's voyages included exploration and mapping in the Pacific and the Southern Ocean, including the eastern coast of Australia and New Caledonia. His second voyage, from 1772 to 1775, explored the Southern Ocean and parts of the central Pacific. In economic thought, Adam Smith published The Wealth of Nations in 1776. The decade also included developments in chemistry associated with scientists such as Daniel Rutherford and Carl Wilhelm Scheele.

== Events ==
=== January– March ===
- January 1 – The foundation of Fort George, Bombay is laid by Colonel Keating, principal engineer, on the site of the former Dongri Fort.
- February 1 – Thomas Jefferson's home at Shadwell, Virginia is destroyed by fire, along with most of his books.
- February 14 – Scottish explorer James Bruce arrives at Gondar, capital of Abyssinia (modern-day Ethiopia) and is received by the Emperor Tekle Haymanot II and Ras Mikael Sehul.
- February 22 – Christopher Seider, an 11-year-old boy in Boston in the British Province of Massachusetts Bay, is shot and killed by a colonial official, Ebenezer Richardson. The funeral sets off anti-British protests that lead to the massacre days later.
- March 5 – Boston Massacre: Eleven American men are shot (five fatally) by British troops, in an event that helps start the American Revolutionary War five years later.
- March 21 – King Prithvi Narayan Shah shifts to the newly constructed Basantapur Palace, in the capital Kathmandu, as the first King of the Unified Kingdom of Nepal.
- March 26 – First voyage of James Cook: English explorer Captain James Cook and his crew aboard HMS Endeavour complete the circumnavigation of New Zealand.

=== April–June ===
- April 12 – The Townshend Acts are repealed by Britain's Parliament by the efforts of Prime Minister Frederick North, with the exception of the increased duties on imported tea. The American colonists, in turn, stop their embargo on British imports.
- April 18 (April 19 by Cook's log) 18:00 – First voyage of James Cook: English explorer Captain James Cook and his crew become the first recorded Europeans to encounter the eastern coastline of the Australian continent. Land is sighted at Point Hicks, and named after Lieutenant Hicks who first observes landform at 6am.
- April 20 – Battle of Aspindza: Georgian king Erekle II defeats the Ottoman forces, despite being abandoned by an ally, Russian General Totleben.
- April 29 – First voyage of James Cook: Captain Cook drops anchor on HMS Endeavour in a wide bay, about 16 km (10 mi) south of the present city of Sydney, Australia. Because the young botanist on board the ship, Joseph Banks, discovers 30,000 specimens of plant life in the area, 1,600 of them unknown to European science, Cook names the place Botany Bay on May 7.
- May 16 – 14-year-old Marie Antoinette of Austria marries Louis-Auguste (who in 1774 becomes King Louis XVI) at the Palace of Versailles.
- May 20 – A stampede at a celebration of the newly wedded Marie Antoinette and Louis-Auguste in Paris kills more than a hundred people.
- June 3
  - Gaspar de Portolà and Father Junípero Serra establish Monterey, the presidio of Alta California territory for Spain from 1777–1822, United Mexican States 1824–1846, until the California Republic.
  - The 7.5 M_{w} Port-au-Prince earthquake affects the French colony of Saint-Domingue with a maximum Mercalli intensity of X (Extreme), killing 250 or more.
- June 9 – Falklands Crisis (1770): Some 1,600 Spanish marines, sent by the Spanish governor of Buenos Aires in five frigates, seize Port Egmont in the Falkland Islands. The small British force present promptly surrenders.
- June 11 – First voyage of James Cook: HMS Endeavour grounds on the Great Barrier Reef.

=== July– September ===
- July 1 – Lexell's Comet (D/1770 L1) passes the Earth at a distance of 2,184,129 kilometres (1,357,155 mi), the closest approach by a comet in recorded history.
- July 5 – Battle of Chesma and Battle of Larga: The Russian Empire defeats the Ottoman Empire in both battles. When the news of the defeat reaches the Ottoman city of Smyrna (July 8), the crowd attacks the Greek community of the city (perceived as favourable to the Russian cause) and kills an estimated 200 Greeks and three Western Europeans (although some reports estimate the number of victims at 3,000 or even 5,000 including "3 or 4 thousands who die due to the fright").
- August 1 (July 21 O.S.) – Russo-Turkish War (1768–74) – Battle of Kagul: Russian commander Pyotr Rumyantsev routs 150,000 Turks.
- August 22 (August 23 by Cook's log) – First voyage of James Cook: Captain Cook determines that New Holland (Australia) is not contiguous with New Guinea, and claims the whole of its eastern coast for Great Britain, later naming it all New South Wales.
- c. September – Johann Gottfried Herder meets Johann Wolfgang von Goethe in Strasbourg.
- September 24 – In Hillsborough, North Carolina, the Regulator Movement riots against local authorities.

=== October–December ===
- October 11 – Phillis Wheatley becomes the first African American woman to have her work published, after having written a poetic elegy to the late Reverend George Whitefield.
- November 14 – James Bruce discovers what he believes to be the source of the Nile.
- December 7 – King Louis XV of France issues the "Edict of December", dismissing the rebellious magistrates of the Parlements of Paris and the other 13 provinces.
- December 24 – France's Secretary of the Navy, César Gabriel de Choiseul, is dismissed from his position by the king.

=== Date unknown ===
- Joseph Priestley, English chemist, recommends the use of a rubber eraser to remove pencil marks.
- Joseph-Louis Lagrange proves Bachet's conjecture.
- The Baron d'Holbach's (anonymous) materialist work Le Système de la Nature ou Des Loix du Monde Physique et du Monde Moral is produced in Neuchâtel.
- The last Cuman to speak the Cuman language (István Varró) dies in Hungary.

=== January– March ===
- January 5 – The Great Kalmyk (Torghut Migration) is led by Ubashi Khan, from the east bank of the Lower Volga River back to the homeland of Dzungaria, at this time under Qing dynasty rule.
- January 9 – Emperor Go-Momozono accedes to the throne of Tokugawa shogunate Japan following his aunt's abdication.
- February 12 – Upon the death of Adolf Frederick, he is succeeded as King of Sweden by his son Gustav III. At the time, however, Gustav is unaware of this, since he is abroad in Paris; the news of his father's death reaches him about a month later.
- March – War of the Regulation: North Carolina Governor William Tryon raises a militia to put down the long-running uprising of backcountry militias against North Carolina's colonial government.
- March 12 – The North Carolina General Assembly establishes Wake County (named for Margaret Wake, the wife of North Carolina Royal Governor William Tryon) from portions of Cumberland, Johnston and Orange counties. Bloomsberry (later known as Wake Courthouse) is made the informal county seat.
- March 15 – The Smeatonian Society of Civil Engineers first meets in London, the world's oldest engineering society.

=== April–June ===
- April 4 – The first quarantines are started in Moscow and Saint Petersburg to fight the bubonic plague epidemic. Over the next 12 months, more than 52,000 people die from the plague in Moscow alone.
- May – Three battles of Sarbakusa: An alliance of three of the most powerful aristocrats of Ethiopia (Goshu of Amhara, Wand Bewossen and Fasil of Damot) defeats Ras Mikael Sehul and Emperor Tekle Haymanot II, taking control of Ethiopia.
- May 11 – War of the Regulation: North Carolina Governor William Tryon marches his military out of Hillsborough, to come to the aid of General Hugh Waddell's beleaguered forces. Tryon's army stops at Alamance Creek, 5 miles (8.0 km) away from the Regulator army.
- May 16 – War of the Regulation – Battle of Alamance: Regulators reject an appeal by Governor Tryon to disperse peacefully. Governor Tryon's forces crush the rebellion, causing many Regulators to move to frontier areas outside of North Carolina.
- May 23 – Battle of Lanckorona: A force of 4,000 Russians under Alexander Suvorov defeat a Polish formation of 1,300 men.
- June 11 – The Society of Gentlemen Supporters of the Bill of Rights meets in the London Tavern and changes its platform to a comprehensive program for British parliamentary reform in advance of the next election.

=== July–September ===
- July 12 – The first voyage of James Cook around the world ends as HMS Endeavour returns to England after almost three years.
- July 13 – Russo-Turkish War (1768–74): Russian forces occupy the Crimea, under Prince Vasily Dolgorukov.
- July 17 – Bloody Falls massacre: Chipewyan chief Matonabbee, traveling as the guide to Samuel Hearne on his Arctic overland journey, massacres a group of unsuspecting Inuit.
- August 8 – The first recorded town cricket match is played, at Horsham, England.
- September 8 – In California, Fathers Pedro Cambon and Angel Somera found Mission Vieja, later called, Mission San Gabriel Arcángel, in what becomes San Gabriel, California.
- September 15–17 – The Moscow plague riot results from an outbreak of bubonic plague, which kills 57,000.

=== October–December ===
- October 9 – The Dutch merchant ship Vrouw Maria sinks off the coast of Finland; Captain Raymund Lourens and his crew escape unharmed.
- October 17 – The opera Ascanio in Alba by Wolfgang Mozart, age 15, premieres in Milan.
- November 3 – Siamese conquest of Ha Tien ends the Siamese civil war of 1767-71.
- November 16 – During the night the River Tyne in the north of England floods, destroying many bridges and killing several people; the replacement main bridge at Newcastle upon Tyne will not be completed until 1781.
- December 3 – The cause of action in Sommersett's Case, which eventually leads to the end of slavery in Great Britain, begins when escaped slave James Somerset is found imprisoned on the ship Ann and Mary.
- December 31 – Men, women and children of the Choctaw and Chickasaw tribes begin a 23-day encampment at Mobile, part of the British colony of West Florida, at the invitation of British Southern Indian superintendent John Stuart, as their leaders negotiate a treaty.

=== Date unknown ===
- The territory of Baden-Baden is inherited by Charles Frederick, Margrave of Baden-Durlach, reunifying the territories of Baden.
- The trade monopoly with Iceland is transferred to the Danish crown.
- The North Carolina General Assembly passes an act establishing the town of Martinsborough, named for Royal Governor Josiah Martin, on the land of Richard Evans, which will serve as the seat of Pitt County.
- Construction of the Putuo Zongcheng Temple complex in Chengde, China is completed during the reign of the Qianlong Emperor.
- Limoges porcelain manufacture is established in France.
- Slovene literature: István Küzmics, the Hungarian Slovene writer and evangelical pastor, publishes (in Halle) the Nouvi Zákon, a translation of the New Testament into the Prekmurje Slovene language, with discrete South Slavic artwork.

=== January–March ===
- January 10 – Shah Alam II, the Mughal Emperor of India, makes a triumphant return to Delhi 15 years after having been forced to flee.
- January 17 – Johann Friedrich Struensee and Queen Caroline Matilda are arrested, leading to his execution and her banishment from Denmark.
- February 12
  - Breton-French explorer Yves-Joseph de Kerguelen-Trémarec discovers the uninhabited Kerguelen Islands in the Southern Indian Ocean.
  - The Virginia Assembly amends an act to describe the punishments for the practice of gouging.
- February 17 – The First Partition of Poland is agreed to by Russia and Prussia, later including Austria.
- March 8 – Biela's Comet is first discovered by French astronomer Jacques Leibax Montaigne, but not proven to be a periodic comet until 1826, when Wilhelm von Biela correctly identifies its return.
- March 20 – Pedro Fages, the Spanish Governor of Alta California, and Juan Crespí, a Catholic priest, set off from the capital at Monterey with a party of 12 soldiers and begin the first European exploration of the lands around San Francisco Bay.

=== April–June ===
- April 8 – Massachusetts legislator Samuel Adams persuades his colleagues to approve his plan for creating a Committee of Correspondence to begin a dialogue with the other American colonies concerning mutual problems with England.
- April 13 – Warren Hastings begins his service for the British East India Company as Governor of Bengal, arriving at the company's headquarters at Fort William, outside of Calcutta, and including what are now parts of northeast India and Bangladesh. Hastings serves for two years, then later becomes Governor-General of India.
- May 8 – The Watauga Association Compact is signed in what is now East Tennessee by a group of white settlers led by William Bean, creating the first non-colonial government body in British North America.
- June 9 – Gaspee Affair: In an act of defiance against the British Navigation Acts, American patriots, led by Abraham Whipple, attack and burn the British customs schooner HMS Gaspee off of Rhode Island.
- June 10 – The crisis of 1772 is triggered when, following the flight of their partner Alexander Fordyce to France, the London banking house of Neal, James, Fordyce and Down (which has been speculating in East India Company stock) suspends payment. The resultant panic causes other banks to fail, extends to Scotland, Amsterdam and the Thirteen Colonies and threatens the East India Company with bankruptcy.
- June 22 – Somersett's Case: Lord Mansfield, the Lord Chief Justice of England and Wales, delivers the decision that leads to the end of slavery in England.
- June 23–28 – Russo-Turkish War (1768–1774): First of two Russian occupations of Beirut, following a naval bombardment which began on June 18.

=== July–September ===
- July 13 – The second voyage of James Cook departs from Plymouth on Captain Cook's new ship, HMS Resolution and the companion ship HMS Adventure in an attempt to prove the existence of an uncharted continent even further south than New Zealand.
- August 5 – The first Partition of the Polish–Lithuanian Commonwealth begins. The Kingdom of Galicia and Lodomeria becomes part of the crown lands of the Habsburg monarchy.
- August 12 – The volcano Mount Papandayan in West Java erupts and partially collapses, the debris avalanche killing several thousand.
- August 21 – A coup d'état by King Gustav III is completed by adopting a new Constitution, ending half a century of parliamentary rule in Sweden, and making him an enlightened despot.
- September 1 – Mission San Luis Obispo de Tolosa is founded in San Luis Obispo, California.

=== October–December ===
- October 28 – Basque-Spanish explorer Domingo de Bonechea, in the Aguila, sights Tauere atoll, which he names San Simon y Judas.
- November 2 – American Revolutionary War: Samuel Adams and Joseph Warren form the first Committee of Correspondence.
- December 14
  - Russian government offices reopen at Moscow and Saint Petersburg after being closed for 15 months because of an epidemic of bubonic plague.
  - Second voyage of James Cook: The crew of HMS Resolution finds that the ice floes encountered on their journey south are a source of fresh water, a "discovery... of utmost importance to the success of the voyage."

=== Date unknown ===
- Scottish scientist Daniel Rutherford discovers nitrogen gas, isolating it from air.
- Frederick II, Duke of Mecklenburg-Schwerin, demands that all bodies remain unburied for three days to ensure that death has actually taken place.

=== January–March ===
- January 1 – The hymn that becomes known as Amazing Grace, at this time titled "1 Chronicles 17:16–17", is first used to accompany a sermon led by curate John Newton in the town of Olney, Buckinghamshire, England.
- January 12 – The first museum in the American colonies is established in Charleston, South Carolina; in 1915, it is formally incorporated as the Charleston Museum.
- January 17 – Second voyage of James Cook: Captain Cook in HMS Resolution (1771) becomes the first European explorer to cross the Antarctic Circle.
- January 18 – The first opera performance in the Swedish language, Thetis and Phelée, performed by Carl Stenborg and Elisabeth Olin in Bollhuset in Stockholm, Sweden, marks the establishment of the Royal Swedish Opera.
- February 8 – The Grand Council of Poland meets in Warsaw, summoned by a circular letter from King Stanisław August Poniatowski to respond to the Kingdom's threatened partition between three foreign powers.
- February 27 – The construction of Christ Church (Alexandria, Virginia), known for being the house of worship for George Washington and the visiting site for subsequent U.S. presidents, is completed.
- March 9–19 – Second voyage of James Cook: Tobias Furneaux in HMS Adventure (1771) explores the coast of Van Diemen's Land.
- March 15 – The popular (and enduring) comedy She Stoops to Conquer, by Irish playwright Oliver Goldsmith, is performed for the first time, premiering at London's Covent Garden Theatre.

=== April–June ===
- April 27 – The Parliament of Great Britain passes the Tea Act (coming into force on May 10), designed to save the British East India Company by granting it a monopoly on the North American tea trade.
- May 8 – In Egypt, Ottoman rebels revolt, killing Ali Bey, Mamluk Sultan of Egypt.
- June 4 – 1773 Phipps expedition towards the North Pole sets out from Britain.
- June 10 – The Regulating Act is given royal assent by King George III, creating the office of Governor General, with an advising council, to exercise political authority over the territory under British East India Company rule in India.

=== July–September ===
- July 14 – The first annual conference of American Methodists is convened at Philadelphia in St. George's Church.
- July 21 – Under pressure from the Bourbon courts, Pope Clement XIV suppresses the Society of Jesus (brief Dominus ac Redemptor). Joseph II, Holy Roman Emperor, expels the order from his territories.
- July 29 (Feast of St Martha) – Guatemala earthquake: The Santa Marta earthquake hits, with an estimated epicentral magnitude of 7.5 M_{i}, striking Guatemala; numerous aftershocks last until December. The city of Antigua Guatemala is virtually destroyed, leading to the decision to move the country's capital to La Nueva Guatemala de la Asunción.
- August 11 – Second voyage of James Cook in the Tuamotus: Captain Cook discovers Tekokota, which he names Doubtful Island.
- August 12 – Second voyage of James Cook in the Tuamotus: Captain Cook discovers Marutea Nord, which he names Furneaux Island.
- September 11 – The Public Advertiser publishes a satirical essay titled Rules By Which A Great Empire May Be Reduced To A Small One, written by Benjamin Franklin.

=== October–December ===
- October 10
  - Daniel Boone leads the first attempt by British colonists to establish a settlement in Kentucky, but is turned back in an attack by Native Americans, in which his son is killed.
  - Russo-Turkish War (1768–1774): Second of the Russian occupations of Beirut begins, following a naval bombardment which began on August 2. The Russians leave Albanian mercenaries as an occupying force.
  - Paul Revere marries Rachel Walker, his second wife.
- October 12 – America's first insane asylum opens for Persons of Insane and Disordered Minds in Williamsburg, Virginia.
- October 13 – French astronomer Charles Messier discovers the Whirlpool Galaxy, an interacting, grand design spiral galaxy located at a distance of approximately 31 million light-years, in the constellation Canes Venatici.
- October 14 – The Komisja Edukacji Narodowej (Polish for National Education Committee), formed in the Polish–Lithuanian Commonwealth, is considered to be the world's first ministry of education.
- November 10 – Four ships – the Dartmouth, the Eleanor, the Beaver and the William – depart Britain for America, carrying the first Indian tea to be subject to the newly enacted taxes. The William is lost in a storm; the Dartmouth is the first ship to reach Boston, docking on November 28.
- December 16 – Boston Tea Party: A group of American colonists, dressed as Mohawk Indians, steal aboard ships of the East India Company and dump their cargo of tea into Boston Harbor, in protest against British tax policies.
- December 23 – Moscow State Academy of Choreography was founded under the reign of Catherine II. It is the second ballet school in Russia after Vaganova Academy of Russian Ballet.

=== Date unknown ===
- Russo-Turkish War (1768–1774): Russian forces fail to take Silistria.
- Emelian Pugachev starts Pugachev's Rebellion in Russia, attacking and occupying Samara.
- John Harrison wins the Longitude prize, for his invention of the marine chronometer.
- Hilaire Rouelle discovers urea.
- Istanbul Technical University is established (under the name of Royal School of Naval Engineering) as the world's first comprehensive institution of higher learning dedicated to engineering education.
- Marsala wine first shipped to England.
- In China, written work begins on the Complete Library of the Four Treasuries, the largest literary compilation of books in China's history (surpassing the Yongle Encyclopedia of the 15th Century). Upon completion in 1782, the books are bound in 36,381 volumes (册) with more than 79,000 chapters (卷), comprising about 2.3 million pages, and approximately 800 million Chinese characters.
- Scottish judge James Burnett, Lord Monboddo, begins publication of Of the Origin and Progress of Language, a contribution to evolutionary ideas of the Enlightenment.
- Friedrich Gottlieb Klopstock publishes the last five cantos of his epic poem Der Messias in Hamburg.

=== January–March ===
- January 21 – Mustafa III, Sultan of the Ottoman Empire, dies and is succeeded by his brother Abdul Hamid I.
- January 27
  - An angry crowd in Boston, Massachusetts seizes, tars, and feathers British customs collector and Loyalist John Malcolm, for striking a boy and a shoemaker, George Hewes, with his cane.
  - British industrialist John Wilkinson patents a method for boring cannon from the solid, subsequently utilised for accurate boring of steam engine cylinders.
- February 3 – The Privy Council of Great Britain, as advisors to King George III, votes for the King's abolition of free land grants of North American lands. Henceforward, land is to be sold at auction to the highest bidder.
- February 6 – The Parlement of Paris votes a sentence of civil degradation, depriving Pierre Beaumarchais of all rights and duties of citizenship.
- February 7 – The volunteer fire company of Trenton, New Jersey, predecessor to the paid Trenton Fire Department created in 1892, is founded. In 1905, at 131 years, it claims to be the oldest continuously serving department in the U.S.
- February 24 – The Province of Massachusetts Bay House of Representatives votes, 92 to 8, to impeach Superior Court Chief Justice Peter Oliver, but Provincial Governor Thomas Hutchinson refuses to allow the trial to proceed.
- March 10 – The Boston Journal makes the first reference to the "Stars and Stripes" flag to symbolize the American colonies, reporting that "The American ensign now sparkles a door which shall shortly flame from the skies."
- March 31 – Intolerable Acts: The British Parliament passes the Boston Port Act, closing the port of Boston, Massachusetts, as punishment for the Boston Tea Party.

=== April–June ===
- April 17 – The first avowedly Unitarian congregation, Essex Street Chapel, is founded in London by Theophilus Lindsey.
- April 19 – The premiere of Iphigénie en Aulide by Christoph Willibald Gluck sparks a huge controversy, almost a war, such as has not been seen in Paris since the Querelle des Bouffons.
- May 10 – Louis XVI becomes King of France, following the death of his grandfather, Louis XV.
- May 17 – The colony of Rhode Island and Providence Plantations issues the first call for an "Intercolonial Congress" that eventually is set up as the Continental Congress.
- May 19 – Shakers Ann Lee and eight followers sail from Liverpool, England for colonial America.
- June 2 – Intolerable Acts: A new Quartering Act, requiring American colonists to provide better housing for British soldiers upon demand, is passed.
- June 16–17 – English explorer James Cook becomes the first European to sight (and name) Palmerston Island in the South Pacific Ocean.
- June 20 (June 9 O.S.) – Russo-Turkish War (1768–1774): Battle of Kozludzha – The Imperial Russian Army, led by Alexander Suvorov, routs numerically superior Ottoman Empire forces.
- June 22 – The Parliament of Great Britain passes the Quebec Act, setting out rules of governance for the colony of Quebec in British North America, enlarging its territory as far south as the Ohio River and west to the Mississippi River, in the area now occupied by the U.S. states of Michigan, Wisconsin, Illinois, Indiana and Ohio and granting freedom of religion for Roman Catholics.

=== July–September ===
- July 21 – Russia and the Ottoman Empire sign the Treaty of Küçük Kaynarca with Russian victory, ending six years of war. The treaty gives Russia the right to intervene in Ottoman politics, to protect its Christian subjects.
- August 1 – The element oxygen is discovered for the third time (the second quantitatively, following the somewhat earlier work of Carl Wilhelm Scheele (1771–72) by Joseph Priestley, who publishes the fact in 1775, and so names the element (and usually gets all the credit, because his work was published first).
- August 6 – Ann Lee and the Shakers arrive in America and settle in New York.
- September 1 – Powder Alarm: Thomas Gage, royal governor of the Province of Massachusetts Bay, orders British soldiers to remove gunpowder from a magazine, causing Patriots to prepare for war.
- September 4 – English explorer James Cook becomes the first European to sight (and name) the island of New Caledonia in Melanesia.
- September 5 – The First Continental Congress assembles in Philadelphia.
- September 15 – Yemelyan Pugachev, leader of Pugachev's Rebellion against Russia by the Yaik Cossacks, is betrayed by his own men after returning to Yaitsk (now Oral, Kazakhstan).
- September 21 – George Mason and George Washington found the Fairfax County Militia Association, a military unit independent of British control.
- September 29 – Johann Wolfgang von Goethe's semi-autobiographical epistolary novel The Sorrows of Young Werther (Die Leiden des jungen Werthers) (written January–March) is published anonymously in Leipzig, Germany; it is influential in the Sturm und Drang movement and Romanticism.

=== October–December ===
- October 10
  - Dunmore's War – Battle of Point Pleasant: Cornstalk is forced to make peace with Dunmore at the Treaty of Camp Charlotte, ceding Shawnee land claims south of the Ohio (modern Kentucky) to Virginia.
  - English explorer James Cook becomes the first European to sight (and name) Norfolk Island in the Pacific Ocean, uninhabited at this date.
- October 14 – The Continental Congress in America adopts the Declaration of Rights and Resolves, with 10 principles.
- October 20 – The First Continental Congress passes the Continental Association, a colony-wide boycotting of British goods. Theater performances in the American colonies are also halted, on the Congress's recommendation that the member colonies "discountenance and discourage all horse racing and all kinds of gaming, cock fighting, exhibitions of shows, plays, and other expensive diversions and entertainments."
- October 21 – The word Liberty is first displayed on a flag raised by colonists in Taunton, Massachusetts, in defiance of British rule in Colonial America.
- October 25 – The Edenton Tea Party takes place in North Carolina, marking the first major gathering of women in support of the American cause.
- October 26 – The first Continental Congress adjourns in Philadelphia.
- November 4 – The Maryland Jockey Club follows a recommendation of the Continental Congress and cancels its race schedule. The decision sets a precedent for other jockey clubs in the colonies, and no major races are held until the end of the American Revolution.
- November 10 – 1774 British general election: Voting for the House of Commons concludes in Great Britain, and Lord North retains the office of Prime Minister as his Tory coalition wins 343 of the 558 seats. Henry Seymour Conway's Whig Party wins the other 215 seats.
- November 15 – The government of the Republic of Venice allows adventurer and ladies' man Giacomo Casanova to return home after a 17-year absence.
- November 20 – Daniel Boone retires from the Virginia colonial militia in order to devote his full time to establishing a settlement in Kentucky.
- November 25 – Salawat Yulayev, the leader of the Bashkirs rebellion against the Russian government, is captured, bringing an end to the insurrection.
- November 26 – English chemist Joseph Priestley becomes the first person to discover and identify sulfur dioxide.
- November 27 – Spanish Navy Captain Domingo de Bonechea arrives at Tahiti in the ship Aguila and tries unsuccessfully to claim it for Spain and to convert the Tahitians to the Roman Catholic faith.
- November 30
  - Parliament adjourns in Great Britain, but declines to authorize any action against the rebellious American colonies, despite an address the day before by King George III and Prime Minister North.
  - Thomas Paine, a native of England, arrives in America at the age 37 and soon becomes an influential advocate for the colonies' independence.
- December 1 – A boycott called by the Continental Congress goes into effect, as participating merchants and supporters cease the importation or consumption of products from Great Britain, Ireland or the British West Indies.
- December 6 – Empress Maria Theresa, the ruler of Austria, Hungary and Croatia, signs the General School Ordinance providing for education for both males and females and setting compulsory education for children aged six through 12.
- December 9 – The two month long Siege of Melilla begins as armies led by the Sultan of Morocco, Mohammed ben Abdallah, attack the North African Spanish colony of Melilla (which remains a part of Spain into the 21st century).
- December 23 – King Louis XVI of France issues a declaration that, for the first time, protects "the free commerce of meat during Lent" to support the needs of "the poor whose infirmity requires them to eat meat."

=== Date unknown ===
- To avoid severe flooding, Martinsborough, North Carolina is moved to higher ground 3 miles (4.8 km) west. The North Carolina General Assembly incorporates Martinsborough as the new seat of Pitt County, 3 years after its founding.
- German cobbler Johann Birkenstock creates the first Birkenstock sandals.
- A revision of the laws of cricket introduces a leg before wicket rule.

=== Summary ===
The American Revolutionary War began this year, with the first military engagement on April 19 Battles of Lexington and Concord on the day after Paul Revere's ride. The Second Continental Congress took various steps toward organizing an American government, appointing George Washington commander-in-chief (June 14), Benjamin Franklin postmaster general (July 26) and creating a Continental Navy (October 13) and a Marine force (November 10) as landing troops for it, but as yet the 13 colonies have not declared independence, and both the British (June 12) and American (July 15) governments make laws. On July 6, Congress issues the Declaration of the Causes and Necessity of Taking Up Arms and on August 23, King George III of Great Britain declares the American colonies in rebellion, announcing it to Parliament on November 10. On June 17, two months into the colonial siege of Boston, at the Battle of Bunker Hill, just north of Boston, British forces are victorious, but only after suffering severe casualties and after Colonial forces run out of ammunition, Fort Ticonderoga is taken by American forces in New York Colony's northern frontier, and American forces unsuccessfully invade Canada, with an attack on Montreal defeated by British forces on November 13 and an attack on Quebec repulsed December 31.

Human knowledge and mastery over nature advanced when James Watt built a successful prototype of a steam engine, and a scientific expedition continued as Captain James Cook claims the South Georgia and South Sandwich Islands in the south Atlantic Ocean for Britain. Nature's power over humanity is dramatically demonstrated when the Independence Hurricane (August 29 – September 13) devastates the east coast of North America, killing 4,173, and a smallpox epidemic begins in New England. Smallpox vaccine was then developed by Edward Jenner.

=== January–June ===
- January – The Habsburg monarchy forces the Ottoman Empire to cede Bukovina to its rule.
- January 5 – Wolfgang Amadeus Mozart finishes a Sonata for Keyboard in C.
- January 14 – Siamese conquest of Chiang Mai and the Lan Na Kingdom.
- January 17 – Second voyage of James Cook: Captain James Cook takes possession of South Georgia for the Kingdom of Great Britain.
- February 9 – American Revolution: The Parliament of Great Britain declares the Province of Massachusetts Bay to be in rebellion.
- February 15 – Pope Pius VI succeeds Pope Clement XIV as the 250th pope.
- February 26 – The British East India Company factory on Balambangan Island is destroyed by Moro pirates.
- March 6 – Raghunathrao, Peshwa of the Maratha Empire in India, signs the Treaty of Surat with the British Governor-General Warren Hastings in Bombay ceding the territories of Salsette and Bassein to the British East India Company along with part of the revenues from Surat and Bharuch districts in return for military assistance. This leads to the First Anglo-Maratha War fought between the British and the Marathas, ending with the Treaty of Salbai in 1782.
- March 17 – Catherine the Great of Russia issues a manifesto prohibiting freed serfs from being returned to serfdom.
- March 23 – American Revolution: Patrick Henry, a delegate to the Second Virginia Convention after the Virginia House of Burgesses was disbanded by the Royal Governor, delivers his "Give me Liberty or give me Death!" speech at St. John's Church in Richmond, Virginia.
- April 18 – American Revolution: Paul Revere and William Dawes, instructed by Dr. Joseph Warren, ride from Boston to Lexington to warn John Hancock and Sam Adams that British forces are coming to take them prisoner and to seize colonial weapons and ammunition in Concord.
- April 19 – American Revolution – Battles of Lexington and Concord: Hostility between Britain and its American colonies explodes into bloodshed, igniting the American Revolutionary War.
- May 10 – American Revolution:
  - The Second Continental Congress meets, elects John Hancock president, raises the Continental Army under George Washington as commander and authorizes the colonies to adopt their own constitutions.
  - Ethan Allen and Benedict Arnold, leading the Green Mountain Boys of Vermont, capture Fort Ticonderoga.
- May 17 – American Revolution: The Continental Congress bans trade with Canada.
- June 11
  - Coronation of Louis XVI takes place in Reims. The last coronation of the Ancien Regime before the French Revolution
  - American Revolutionary War – Battle of Machias: In the first naval engagement of the American Revolution, Patriot forces capture the schooner HMS Margaretta.
- June 12 – American Revolution:
  - The British forces offer a pardon to all colonists who lay down their arms.
  - Action by citizens of Machias, Maine, in capturing British ships recognises the existence of a United States Merchant Marine.
- June 14 – American Revolution: The Continental Congress names George Washington as commander of the Continental Army.
- June 16 – The post of chief engineer of the Continental Army is created.
- June 17 – American Revolution: Two months into the colonial siege of Boston, British open fire on Breed's Hill on Charles Town Peninsula. After 3 charges, the British take the hill in the Battle of Bunker Hill.
- June 19 – The post of Commanding General is created by the Continental Congress.

=== July–December ===
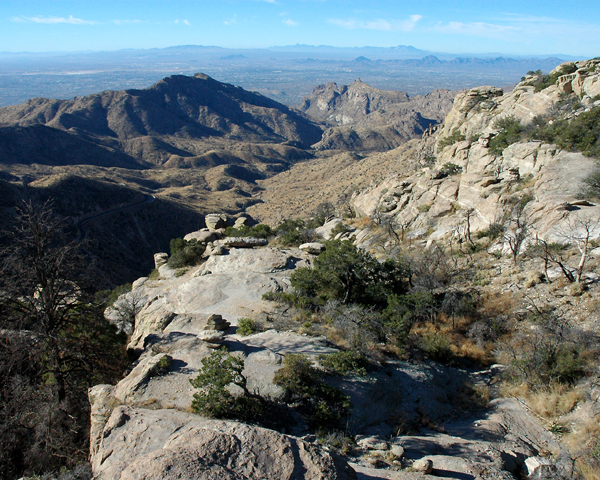
August 18: Tucson is founded.

- July 3 – American Revolution: George Washington takes command of the 17,000-man Continental Army at Cambridge.
- July 5 – American Revolution: The Continental Congress sends the Olive Branch Petition, hoping for a reconciliation.
- July 6 – American Revolution: The Continental Congress issues Declaration of the Causes and Necessity of Taking Up Arms, which contains the words: "Our cause is just. Our union is perfect... being with one mind resolved to die freemen rather than to live slaves...".
- July 26 – The Second Continental Congress appoints Benjamin Franklin to be the first Postmaster General of what later becomes the United States Post Office Department.
- July 30 – Second voyage of James Cook: HMS Resolution (1771) anchors off the south coast of England, Captain Cook having completed the first eastbound global circumnavigation.
- August 18 – Tucson is founded.
- August 21 – American Revolution – Siege of Fort St. Jean: American rebels launch an invasion of Canada.
- August 23 – American Revolution: Refusing to even look at the Olive Branch Petition, King George issues a Proclamation of Rebellion against the American colonies.
- August 29 – September 12 – The Independence Hurricane from South Carolina to Nova Scotia kills 4,170, mostly fishermen and sailors.
- September 25 – American Revolution: Siege of Fort St. Jean – Battle of Longue-Pointe: Thirteen Colonies revolutionary forces under Maj. Ethan Allen attack Montreal in Quebec, commanded by British General Guy Carleton. Allen's forces are defeated, and Allen himself is captured and held on British ships until he is released.
- October – The Sayre Plotters attempt to kidnap George III of the United Kingdom.
- October 13 – American Revolution: The Continental Congress orders the establishment of the Continental Navy (later the United States Navy).
- October 26 – American Revolution: George III announces to Parliament that the American colonies are in an uprising and must be dealt with accordingly.
- November – American Revolution: Colonel Richard Richardson's South Carolina revolutionaries march through Ninety-Six District in what becomes known as the Snow Campaign, effectively ending all major support for the Loyalist cause in the backcountry of South Carolina.
- November 7 – American Revolution: John Murray, 4th Earl of Dunmore, British royal governor of the Colony of Virginia, signs Dunmore's Proclamation, declaring martial law and offering freedom to slaves of Patriots who run away from their owners and join the Loyalist forces (formal proclamation November 15) thus losing the support of planters who see slaves as their vital livelihood.
- November 10 – American Revolution: The Continental Congress passes a resolution creating the Continental Marines to serve as landing troops for the recently created Continental Navy (the Marines are disbanded at end of the war in April 1783 but reformed on July 11, 1798 as the United States Marine Corps).
- November 13 – American Revolution: Battle of Montreal – American forces under Brigadier General Richard Montgomery capture Montreal. British General Guy Carleton escapes to Quebec.
- November 17 – The city of Kuopio, Finland (belonging to Sweden at this time) is founded by King Gustav III of Sweden.
- December 5 – American Revolution: Henry Knox begins his journey to Cambridge, Massachusetts with the artillery that has been captured from Fort Ticonderoga.
- December 31 – American Revolution: Battle of Quebec – British forces repulse an attack by Continental Army generals Richard Montgomery and Benedict Arnold at Quebec; Montgomery is killed.

=== Date unknown ===
- Industrial Revolution in Great Britain.
  - James Watt's 1769 steam engine patent is extended to June 1800 by Act of Parliament and the first engines are built under it.
  - John Wilkinson invents and patents a new kind of boring machine.
- Catherine the Great decrees a Statute for the Administration of the Provinces of the Russian Empire dividing the country into provinces and districts for efficient government.
- A smallpox epidemic begins in New England.
- Typhoon Liengkieki devastates the Pacific atoll of Pingelap.
- Wolfgang Amadeus Mozart writes his five violin concertos in Salzburg at about this date.
- The Calcutta Theatre is inaugurated.
- Shneur Zalman of Liadi founds the Chabad-Lubavitch Hasidic Jewish dynasty.
- Probable date – Jeanne Baret returns to France, becoming the first woman to complete a circumnavigation of the globe.

=== January–February ===
- January 1 – American Revolutionary War: Burning of Norfolk – The town of Norfolk, Virginia is destroyed, by the combined actions of the British Royal Navy and occupying Patriot forces.
- January 10 – American Revolution: Thomas Paine publishes his pamphlet Common Sense, arguing for independence from British rule in the Thirteen Colonies.
- January 20 – American Revolution: South Carolina Loyalists led by Robert Cunningham sign a petition from prison, agreeing to all demands for peace by the formed state government of South Carolina.
- January 24 – American Revolution: Henry Knox arrives at Cambridge, Massachusetts, with the artillery that he has transported from Fort Ticonderoga.
- February 17 – Edward Gibbon publishes the first volume of The History of the Decline and Fall of the Roman Empire.
- February 27 – American Revolution: Battle of Moore's Creek Bridge – Scottish North Carolina Loyalists charge across Moore's Creek Bridge near Wilmington to attack what they mistakenly believe to be a small force of rebels. Several leaders are killed in the ensuing battle. The patriot victory ends virtually all British authority in the province.

=== March–April ===
- March – Restrictions on the grain trade in Sweden are lifted.
- March 1 – The Peshwa of the Maratha Empire and the British East India Company sign the Treaty of Purandar in which the British are able to secure Salsette Island and accept Sawai Madhavrao as a new Peshwa. The Marathas agree not to recognise existence of the French in India.
- March 2–3 – American Revolutionary War:
  - Battle of Nassau: The American Continental Navy and Marines make a successful assault on Nassau, Bahamas.
  - Battle of the Rice Boats: American Patriots resist the Royal Navy on the Savannah River; British control over the Province of Georgia is lost.
- March 4 – American Revolutionary War: American Patriots capture Dorchester Heights, dominating the port of Boston.
- March 9 – Scottish economist Adam Smith publishes The Wealth of Nations in London.
- March 17 – American Revolutionary War: Threatened by Patriot cannons on Dorchester Heights, the British evacuate Boston, ending the 11‑month Siege of Boston.
- March 25 – American Revolutionary War: American Patriots conduct a Raid on Tybee Island, primarily seeking to capture runaway slaves who sought refuge with British forces stationed there.
- March 28
  - Juan Bautista de Anza finds the site for the Presidio of San Francisco.
  - Foundation of the ballet troupe which becomes the world-renowned Bolshoi Ballet in Moscow, Russian Empire.
- April 12 – American Revolution: The Royal Colony of North Carolina produces the Halifax Resolves, making it the first British colony to officially authorize its Continental Congress delegates to vote for independence from the Kingdom of Great Britain.
- April 27 – Jeongjo becomes the King of Joseon following the death of his grandfather Yeongjo.

=== May–June ===
- May 1 – Adam Weishaupt founds the Illuminati in Ingolstadt, Bavaria.
- May 4 – Rhode Island becomes the first American colony to renounce allegiance to King George III of Great Britain.
- May 15–26 – American Revolution: Battle of the Cedars – British forces skirmish with the American Continental Army around Les Cèdres, Quebec.
- June 6 – A fire destroys major parts of the town of Askersund, Sweden.
- June 7 – American Revolution: Lee Resolution – Richard Henry Lee of Virginia proposes to the Second Continental Congress (meeting in Philadelphia) that "these united colonies are, and of right ought to be, free and independent states."
- June 8 – American Revolution: Battle of Trois-Rivières – The invading American Continental Army is driven back at Trois-Rivières, Quebec.
- June 10 – Death of King Hsinbyushin of the Konbaung dynasty in Burma.
- June 11 – American Revolution: The Continental Congress appoints a Committee of Five to draft a Declaration of Independence.
- June 12 – American Revolution: The Virginia Declaration of Rights (by George Mason) is adopted by the Virginia Convention of Delegates.
- June 15 – American Revolution: Delaware Separation Day – The Delaware General Assembly votes to suspend government under the British Crown.
- June 17 – Lt. José Joaquín Moraga leads a band of colonists from Monterey Presidio, landing on June 29 and, with Father Francisco Palóu, constructing the Mission San Francisco de Asís ("Mission Dolores") of the new Presidio of San Francisco, the oldest surviving building in the modern-day city.
- June 28 – American Revolutionary War: Battle of Sullivan's Island – South Carolina militia repel a British attack on Charleston.
- June 29 – American Revolutionary War: Battle of Turtle Gut Inlet – The American Continental Navy successfully challenges the British Royal Navy blockade off New Jersey.

=== July–August ===
- July 2 – American Revolution: The Continental Congress adopts the Lee Resolution.
- July 4 – American Revolution: United States Declaration of Independence – The Continental Congress approves the declaration by the United States of its independence from the Kingdom of Great Britain. The text was drafted during June by Benjamin Franklin.
- July 4 - The Albertina art museum is founded in Vienna, Austria.
- July 8 – American Revolution: The Liberty Bell rings in Philadelphia for the first public reading of the Declaration of Independence.
- July 9 – American Revolution – An angry mob in New York City topples and beheads the equestrian statue of George III of Great Britain in Bowling Green; much of its metal content will be used to make musket balls.
- July 12 – Captain James Cook sets off from Plymouth, England, in HMS Resolution on his third voyage, to the Pacific Ocean and Arctic, which will be fatal to him.
- July 21 – Mozart's Serenade No. 7 (the "Haffner") is first performed in Salzburg, Austria.
- July 29 – Domínguez–Escalante expedition: Francisco Silvestre Vélez de Escalante, Francisco Atanasio Domínguez and eight other Spaniards set out from Santa Fe on an 1800-mile (2900 km) trek through the American Southwest. They are the first Europeans to explore the vast region between the Rockies and the Sierras.
- August 1 – The Viceroyalty of the Río de la Plata is established in southern South America.
- August 2 – Delegates of most of the American colonies sign the Declaration of Independence.
- August 15 – American Revolution: The first Hessian troops land on Staten Island, to join British forces.
- August 25 – Scottish philosopher and historian David Hume dies in Edinburgh.
- August 27 – American Revolution: Battle of Long Island – George Washington's troops are defeated in Brooklyn by the British, under William Howe.
- August – The guild organisation Marchandes de modes is founded in Paris.

=== September–October ===
- September 1 – Cherokee–American wars: The invasion of the Cherokee Nation by 6,000 patriot troops from Virginia, North Carolina, and South Carolina begins. The troops destroy 36 Cherokee towns.
- September 6 – A hurricane hits Guadeloupe, killing more than 6,000 people.
- September 7 – American Revolutionary War: World's first submarine attack – The American submersible craft Turtle attempts to attach a time bomb to the hull of British Admiral Richard Howe's flagship HMS Eagle in New York Harbor.
- September 9 – The Continental Congress officially names its union of states the United States (previously the United Colonies).
- September 11 – American Revolutionary War: An abortive peace conference takes place between the British and Americans, on Staten Island.
- September 15 – American Revolutionary War: Landing at Kip's Bay – British troops land on Manhattan at Kips Bay.

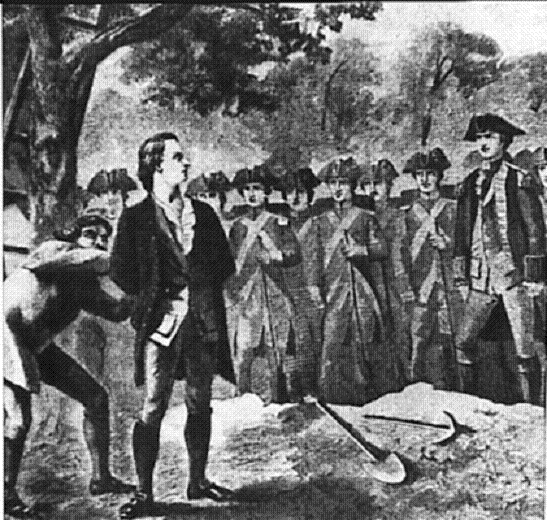
September 22: British hang spy Nathan Hale in New York City.

- September 16 – American Revolutionary War: Battle of Harlem Heights – The Continental Army under Washington is victorious against the British on Manhattan.
- September 17 – The Presidio of San Francisco is founded in New Spain.
- September 20 – The Great Fire of New York (1776) starts during the night, ending the following morning.
- September 22 – American Revolutionary War – Nathan Hale is executed by the British in New York City for espionage.
- September 24
  - The first running of the St Leger Stakes horse race (not yet named) in England, first of the British Classic Races, devised by Anthony St Leger (British Army officer), takes place on Cantley Common at Doncaster. The winner is a filly (later named Allabaculia) owned by the organiser, the 2nd Marquess of Rockingham.
  - The Bolshoi Theatre company hosts its first annual opera season, with the opening of the Bolshoi Kamenny Theatre in Saint Petersburg, Russia.
- October 7 – Crown Prince Paul of Russia marries Sophie Dorothea of Württemberg.
- October 9 – Father Francisco Palóu founds the Mission San Francisco de Asís, in what becomes San Francisco.
- October 11 – American Revolutionary War: Battle of Valcour Island – On Lake Champlain near Valcour Island, a British fleet led by Sir Guy Carleton defeats 15 American gunboats, commanded by Brigadier General Benedict Arnold. Although nearly all of Arnold's ships are destroyed, the two-day-long battle will give Patriot forces enough time to prepare the defenses of New York City.
- October 18 – American Revolutionary War: Battle of Pell's Point – Troops of the American Continental Army resist a British and Hessian force in The Bronx.
- October 28 – American Revolutionary War: Battle of White Plains – British forces arrive at White Plains, attack and capture Chatterton Hill from the Americans.
- October 31 – In his first speech before the British Parliament since the Declaration of Independence this summer, King George III acknowledges that all is not going well for Britain, in the war with the United States.

=== November–December ===
- November 16
  - American Revolutionary War: Battle of Fort Washington – Hessian forces under Lieutenant General Wilhelm von Knyphausen capture Fort Washington (Manhattan) from the American Continental Army.
  - The captain of the American navy ship Andrew Doria fires a salute to the Dutch flag on Fort Oranje, and Johannes de Graaff answers with 11 gun shots.
- November 20 – American Revolutionary War: Battle of Fort Lee – The invasion of New Jersey, by British and Hessian forces, leads to the subsequent general retreat of the American Continental Army.
- December 5 – The Phi Beta Kappa society is founded at the College of William & Mary in Virginia.
- December 6 – The General Assembly of Virginia votes to create Kentucky County as the portion of the colony's Fincastle County that is located west of the Cumberland Mountains. In 1792, the county will become the 15th state of the United States as the Commonwealth of Kentucky. The rest of Fincastle County, between the Blue Ridge Mountains and the Appalachians is divided into the first county to be named after George Washington (Washington County, Virginia) in the south along the border with the North Carolina colony, and Montgomery County in the north. The divisions take effect on December 31.
- December 7 – American Revolutionary War: The Marquis de Lafayette attempts to enter the American military as a major general.
- December 12 – The second Continental Congress ends after a session that began on May 10, 1775, and continued for 582 days.
- December 19 – American Revolution – Thomas Paine, living with Washington's troops, publishes the first in the series of pamphlets on The American Crisis in The Pennsylvania Journal, opening with the stirring phrase, "These are the times that try men's souls."
- December 21 – American Revolution: The Royal Colony of North Carolina reorganizes into the State of North Carolina after adopting its own constitution. Richard Caswell becomes the first governor of the newly formed state.

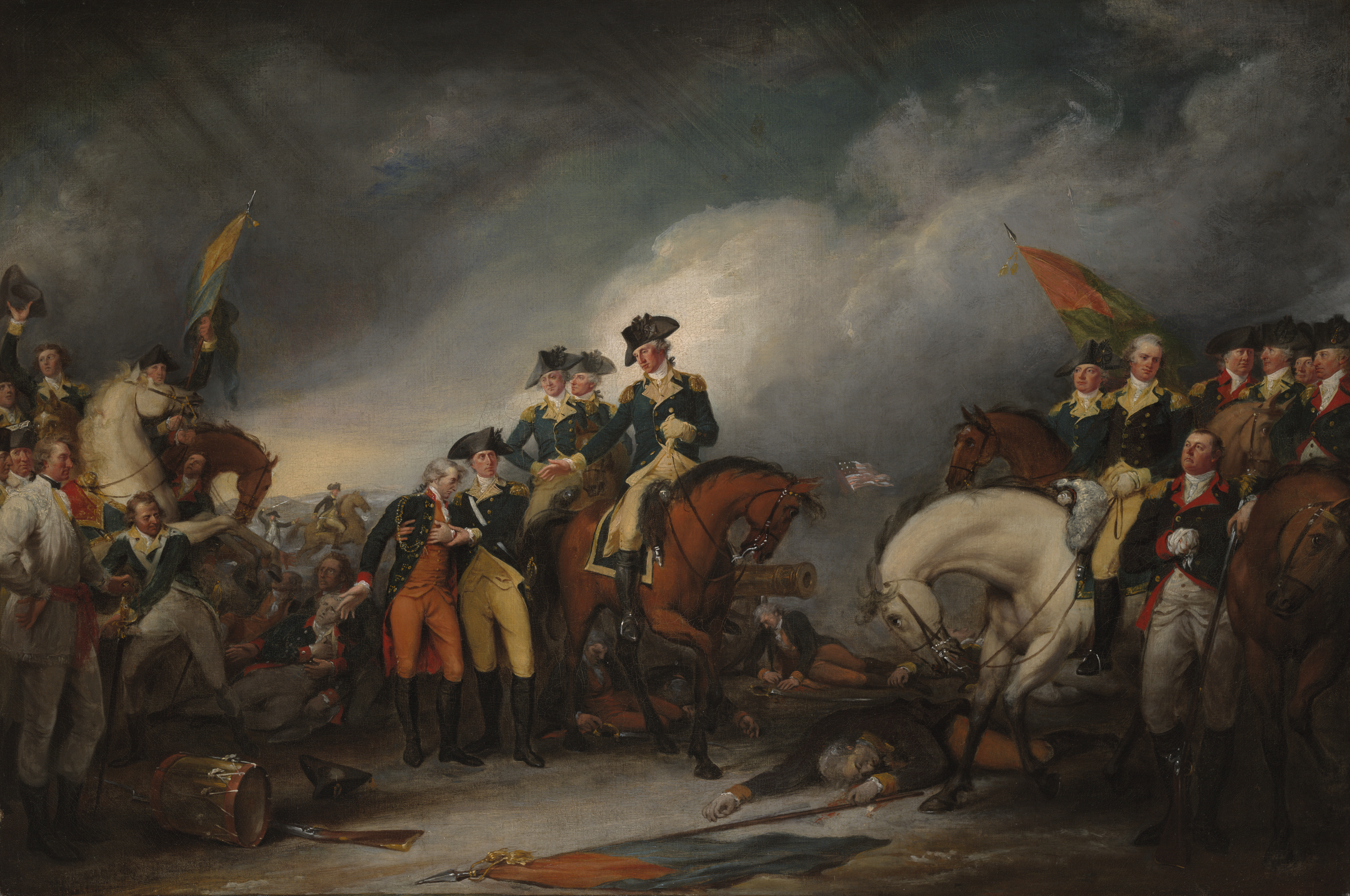
December 26: Capture of the Hessians at Trenton

- December 25 – American Revolution: George Washington's crossing of the Delaware River – At 6 p.m. Gen. George Washington and his troops, numbering 2,400, march to McConkey's Ferry, cross the Delaware River and land on the New Jersey bank by 3 a.m. the following morning.
- December 26 – American Revolutionary War: Battle of Trenton – Washington's troops surprise the 1,500 Hessian troops under the command of Col. Johann Rall at 8 a.m. outside Trenton and score a victory, taking 948 prisoners while suffering only five wounded.

=== Date unknown ===
- Adlan II becomes ruler of the Kingdom of Sennar.
- The first commercial examples of the Watt steam engine are sold.

=== January–March ===
- January 2 – American Revolutionary War – Battle of the Assunpink Creek: American general George Washington's army repulses a British attack by Lieutenant General Charles Cornwallis, in a second battle at Trenton, New Jersey.
- January 3 – American Revolutionary War – Battle of Princeton: American general George Washington's army defeats British troops.
- January 12 – Mission Santa Clara de Asís is founded in what becomes Santa Clara, California.
- January 15 – Vermont declares its independence from New York, becoming the Vermont Republic, an independent country, a status it retains until it joins the United States as the 14th state in 1791.
- January 21 – The Continental Congress approves a resolution "that an unauthentic copy, with names of the signers of the Declaration of independence, be sent to each of the United States.
- February 5 – Under the 1st Constitution of Georgia, 8 counties are chartered: Burke, Camden, Chatham, Effingham, Glynn, Liberty, Richmond, and Wilkes. This dissolves the existing parishes of St. George, St. Mary's, St. Thomas, St. Phillip, Christ Church, St. David, St. Matthews, St. Andrew, St. James, St. Johns, and St. Paul.
- February 24 – King Joseph I of Portugal dies, and is succeeded by his daughter Maria I of Portugal, and his brother and son-in-law Peter III of Portugal.
- March 4 – The Fourth Continental Congress, with John Hancock as president, begins a 199 day session in Philadelphia, lasting until September 18.
- March 29–30 – Third voyage of James Cook: English explorer Captain Cook discovers Mangaia and Atiu in the Cook Islands.

=== April–June ===
- April 1 – Friedrich Maximilian Klinger's play Sturm und Drang is premiered by the Seyler Theatre Company in Leipzig, giving its name to the whole Sturm und Drang movement in German literature.
- April 13 – American Revolutionary War – Battle of Bound Brook: A British and Hessian force led by Charles Cornwallis surprises a Continental Army outpost in New Jersey, commanded by Major General Benjamin Lincoln.
- April 27 – American Revolutionary War – Battle of Ridgefield: The British Army defeats Patriot militias, galvanizing resistance in the Connecticut Colony.
- May 8 – Richard Brinsley Sheridan's comedy of manners, The School for Scandal, is first performed at the Theatre Royal, Drury Lane in London.
- May 16 – Gwinnett–McIntosh duel: Lachlan McIntosh and Button Gwinnett shoot each other during a duel near Savannah, Georgia. Gwinnett, a signer of the United States Declaration of Independence, dies three days later.
- June 13 – American Revolution: The Marquis de Lafayette lands near Georgetown, South Carolina, to help the Continental Congress train its army.

June 14: US Flag (had various star patterns)

- June 14 – The Stars and Stripes is adopted by the Continental Congress as the flag of the United States.
- June 21 – Encyclopædia Britannica Second Edition begins publication in Edinburgh.

=== July–December ===
- July 6 – American Revolutionary War – Siege of Fort Ticonderoga: After a bombardment by British artillery under General John Burgoyne, American forces retreat from Fort Ticonderoga, New York.
- July 7 – American Revolutionary War – Battle of Hubbardton: British forces capture over 200 of the American rearguard, from Fort Ticonderoga.
- July 8 – The 1777 Constitution of Vermont is signed, officially abolishing slavery.
- August 6 – American Revolutionary War – Battle of Oriskany: Loyalists gain a tactical victory over Patriots; Iroquois fight on both sides.
- August 16 – American Revolutionary War – Battle of Bennington: British and Brunswicker forces are decisively defeated by American troops at Walloomsac, New York.
- August 22 – American Revolutionary War – The Siege of Fort Stanwix is ended by withdrawal of British forces, following a ruse by Benedict Arnold to persuade them that a much larger force is arriving.
- September 3 – American Revolutionary War – Battle of Cooch's Bridge: British and Hessian forces defeat an American militia in a minor skirmish in New Castle County, Delaware.
- September 11 – American Revolutionary War – Battle of Brandywine: The British gain a major victory in Chester County, Pennsylvania.
- September 19 – American Revolutionary War – First Battle of Saratoga (Battle of Freeman's Farm): Patriot forces withstand a British attack at Saratoga, New York.
- September 26 – American Revolutionary War – British troops occupy Philadelphia; members of the Continental Congress flee to Lancaster, Pennsylvania, where they meet and hold a one day session as the Fifth Congress before fleeing again.
- September 30 – American Revolutionary War – The Sixth Continental Congress opens its session at York, Pennsylvania, and continues for 272 days until June 27, 1778.
- October 4 – American Revolutionary War – Battle of Germantown: Troops under George Washington are repelled by British troops under Sir William Howe.
- October 6 – American Revolutionary War – Battle of Forts Clinton and Montgomery: British troops capture Fort Clinton and Fort Montgomery (Hudson River), and are able to dismantle the Hudson River Chain.
- October 7 – American Revolutionary War – Second Battle of Saratoga (Battle of Bemis Heights): British General John Burgoyne is defeated by American troops.
- October 17 – American Revolutionary War – Battle of Saratoga: British General John Burgoyne surrenders to the American troops.
- November 15 – American Revolution: After 16 months of debate, the Continental Congress approves the Articles of Confederation, in the temporary American capital at York, Pennsylvania.
- November 17 – American Revolution: The Articles of Confederation are submitted to the states for ratification.
- November 29 – San Jose, California, is founded. It is the first pueblo in Spanish Alta California.
- December 18 – The United States celebrates its first Thanksgiving, marking October's victory by the American rebels over British General John Burgoyne at Saratoga.
- December 19 – American Revolutionary War – George Washington's Continental Army goes into winter quarters at Valley Forge, Pennsylvania.
- December 20 – Morocco recognizes the United States as a sovereign state.
- December 24 – Third voyage of James Cook: English explorer Captain Cook locates Kiritimati (Christmas Island).
- December 30 – Maximilian III Joseph, Elector of Bavaria dies and is succeeded by his distant cousin Charles Theodore, Elector of Bavaria.

=== Date unknown ===
- The code duello is adopted at the Clonmel Summer Assizes as the form for pistol duels by gentlemen in Ireland. It is quickly denounced, but nevertheless widely adopted throughout the English-speaking world.
- Kunsthochschule Kassel is founded in Germany as a fine arts academy.
- Det Dramatiske Selskab is founded in Copenhagen (Denmark) as an acting academy.
- George II Frederic is crowned as king of the Miskito Kingdom.

=== January–March ===
- January 18 – Third voyage of James Cook: Captain James Cook, with ships HMS Resolution and HMS Discovery, first views Oʻahu then Kauaʻi in the Hawaiian Islands of the Pacific Ocean, which he names the Sandwich Islands.
- February 5 – In the United States:
  - South Carolina becomes the first state to ratify the Articles of Confederation.
  - General John Cadwalader shoots and seriously wounds Major General Thomas Conway in a duel after a dispute between the two officers over Conway's continued criticism of General George Washington's leadership of the Continental Army.
- February 6 – American Revolutionary War: In Paris, the Treaty of Alliance and the Treaty of Amity and Commerce are signed by the United States and France, signaling official French recognition of the new republic.
- February 23 – American Revolutionary War: Friedrich Wilhelm von Steuben arrives at Valley Forge, Pennsylvania and begins to train the American troops.
- March 6–October 24 – Captain Cook explores and maps the Pacific Northwest coast of North America, from Cape Foulweather (Oregon) to the Bering Strait.
- March 10 – American Revolutionary War: George Washington approves the dishonorable discharge of Lieutenant Frederick Gotthold Enslin, for "attempting to commit sodomy, with John Monhort a soldier".

=== April–June ===
- April 7 – Former British prime minister William Pitt delivers his last speech to Parliament, and speaks to the House of Lords "passionately but incoherently against the granting of independence" to the American colonies, but collapses during the debate, and dies five weeks later.
- April 12 – King George III appoints the five-member Carlisle Peace Commission to present peace terms to negotiate an end to the rebellion of Britain's 13 American colonies.
- April 30 – The 1,800 feet (550 m) long Hudson River Chain, designed to prevent British ships from moving up the river toward West Point, New York is stretched across the river and anchored by an engineering team under the direction of Captain Thomas Machin.
- May 12 – Heinrich XI, Prince Reuss of Greiz is elevated to Prince of the Principality of Reuss-Greiz by Joseph II, Holy Roman Emperor. This year sees the first appearance of the modern-day national colors of Germany on a flag that closely resembles the modern flag of Germany, to occur anywhere within modern-day Germany.
- May 30 – Benedict Arnold signs the U.S. Oath of Allegiance at Valley Forge.
- June 24 – A total solar eclipse takes place across parts of North America, from Texas to Virginia.
- June 28 – American Revolutionary War: Battle of Monmouth – George Washington's Continental Army battles British general Sir Henry Clinton's army to a draw, near Monmouth County, New Jersey.
- June – The Anglo-French War (1778–83) begins.

=== July–September ===
- July 3 – American Revolutionary War: The Battle of Wyoming takes place near Wilkes-Barre, Pennsylvania, ending in a terrible defeat for the local colonists.
- July 4 – American Revolutionary War: George Rogers Clark takes Kaskaskia.
- July 10 – Louis XVI of France declares war on the Kingdom of Great Britain.
- July 26 – In the Russian Empire, the forced emigration of Christians from the Crimea to Pryazovia begins.
- July 27 – American Revolutionary War: First Battle of Ushant – British and French fleets fight to a standoff.
- August 3 – The La Scala Opera House opens in Milan, with the première of Antonio Salieri's Europa riconosciuta.
- August 26 – Triglav, at 2,864 metres (9,396 ft) above sea level the highest peak of Slovenia, is ascended for the first time by four men: Luka Korošec, Matevž Kos, Štefan Rožič, and Lovrenc Willomitzer, on Sigmund Zois' initiative.
- August 29 – American Revolutionary War: The tactically inconclusive Battle of Rhode Island takes place, after which the Continental Army abandons its position on Aquidneck Island.
- September – The Massachusetts Banishment Act, providing punishment for Loyalists, is passed.
- September 7 – American Revolutionary War: Invasion of Dominica – The French capture the British fort there, before the latter is aware that France has entered the war in the Franco-American alliance.
- September 17 – The Treaty of Fort Pitt is signed, the first formal treaty between the United States and a Native American tribe (the Lenape or Delaware).
- September 19 – The Continental Congress passes the first budget of the United States.

=== October–December ===
- October 12 – The Continental Congress advises the 13 member states to suppress "theatrical entertainments, horse-racing, gaming, and such other diversions as are productive of idleness, dissipation, and general depravity of principles and manners."

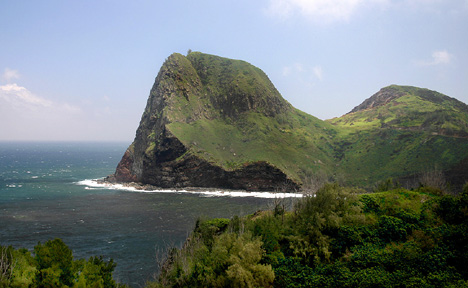
November 26: Captain Cook lands on Maui.

- November 11 – American Revolutionary War: Cherry Valley massacre – British forces and their Iroquois allies attack a fort and the village of Cherry Valley, New York, killing 14 soldiers and 30 civilians.
- November 26
  - In the Hawaiian Islands, Captain James Cook becomes the first European to land on Maui.
  - New Jersey becomes the second state to agree to the Articles of Confederation.
- December 10 – John Jay of New York is chosen as the sixth President of the Continental Congress.
- December 29 – American Revolutionary War: Capture of Savannah – British forces under Archibald Campbell take the city of Savannah, Georgia.

=== Undated ===
- The first settlement is made in the area of modern-day Louisville, Kentucky, by 13 families under Colonel George Rogers Clark.
- Phillips Academy is founded in Massachusetts by Samuel Phillips Jr.
- The term thoroughbred is first used in the United States, in an advertisement in a Kentucky gazette, to describe a New Jersey stallion called Pilgarlick.
- Thomas Kitchin's The Present State of the West-Indies: Containing an Accurate Description of What Parts Are Possessed by the Several Powers in Europe is published in London.
- The city of Ulaanbaatar is settled at its present location, having functioned as a mobile monastic settlement since 1639.

=== January–March ===
- January 11
  - British troops surrender to the Marathas in Wadgaon, India, and are forced to return all territories acquired since 1773.
- January 22 – American Revolutionary War – Claudius Smith is hanged at Goshen, Orange County, New York for supposed acts of terrorism upon the people of the surrounding communities.
- January 29 – After a second petition for partition from its residents, the North Carolina General Assembly abolishes Bute County, North Carolina (established 1764) by dividing it and naming the northern portion Warren County (for Revolutionary War hero Joseph Warren), the southern portion Franklin County (for Benjamin Franklin). The General Assembly also establishes Warrenton (also named for Joseph Warren) to be the seat of Warren County, and Louisburg (named for Louis XVI of France) to be the seat of Franklin County.
- February 12 – Lieutenant Colonel Francisco Bouligny arrives with Malagueño colonists at Bayou Teche, to establish the city of New Iberia, Louisiana.
- February 14 – Captain James Cook is killed on the Sandwich Islands, on his third voyage.
- March 1 – Capture and sack of Vientiane by Siamese forces.
- March 10 – The Treaty of Aynalıkavak is signed between Ottoman Turkey and the Russian Empire, regarding the Crimean Khanate.

=== April–June ===
- April 12 – Spain and France secretly sign the Convention of Aranjuez, with Spain joining an alliance against Great Britain in return for France's pledge to recover all Spanish territory lost to the British.
- May 13 – War of the Bavarian Succession – Russian and French mediators at the Congress of Teschen negotiate an end to the war. In the agreement Austria receives a part of the Bavarian territory (the Innviertel), and relinquishes the rest.
- June 1 – American Revolutionary War – Benedict Arnold is court-martialed for malfeasance, in his treatment of government property.
- June 16 – American Revolutionary War – In support of France, Spain declares war on Britain.
- June 21 – King Charles III of Spain issues a declaration of war against Great Britain.

=== July–September ===
- July 16 – The Great Siege of Gibraltar begins. This is an action by French and Spanish forces to wrest control of Gibraltar from the established British garrison. The garrison, led by George Augustus Eliott (later 1st Baron Heathfield of Gibraltar), survives all attacks and a blockade of supplies.
- July 16
  - American Revolutionary War – United States forces, led by General Anthony Wayne, capture Stony Point, New York from British troops.
  - Declaratory Rescript of the Illyrian Nation issued in order to regulate organization of Eastern Orthodox Church in Habsburg monarchy.
- July 20 – Tekle Giyorgis I begins the first of his five reigns as Emperor of Ethiopia.
- July 22 – Battle of Minisink: The Goshen Militia is destroyed by Joseph Brant's forces.
- July 24 – American Revolutionary War – American forces, led by Commodore Dudley Saltonstall, launch the Penobscot Expedition in what is now Castine, Maine, resulting in the worst naval defeat in U.S. history, until surpassed by the attack on Pearl Harbor in 1941.
- August 17 – Action of 17 August 1779: The 64-gun British warship HMS Ardent is captured by France in the English Channel off of Plymouth after an ineffective attempt by the British captain to properly aim its cannons at the French frigate Junon.
- August 23 – Martín de Mayorga, Captain-General of Guatemala, becomes the Spanish Viceroy of New Spain after the death of Antonio María de Bucareli.
- September 14–15 – American Revolutionary War – Little Beard's Town, a loyalist stronghold, is burnt by the Sullivan Expedition.
- September 21 – Battle of Baton Rouge – Spanish troops under Bernardo de Gálvez capture the city from the British.
- September 23 – American Revolutionary War – Battle of Flamborough Head – The American ship Bonhomme Richard, commanded by John Paul Jones, engages the British ship HMS Serapis. The Bonhomme Richard sinks, but the Americans board the Serapis and other vessels, and are victorious.
- September 28 – Samuel Huntington is elected as the seventh President of the Continental Congress.

=== October–December ===
- October 1 – The city of Tampere, Finland (belonging to Sweden at this time) is founded by King Gustav III of Sweden.
- October 4 – The Fort Wilson Riot against James Wilson and others in Philadelphia takes place.
- November 2 – The North Carolina General Assembly carves a new county from Dobbs County, North Carolina and names it Wayne County, in honor of United States General Anthony Wayne.
- December 13 – Alexandre, Vicomte de Beauharnais marries Joséphine Tascher.
- December 25 – Fort Nashborough (later to become Nashville, Tennessee) is founded by James Robertson.
- December 31 – Affair of Fielding and Bylandt: Following a brief naval engagement between the British and Dutch off the Isle of Wight, the Dutch merchantmen and naval vessels are captured and taken to Portsmouth, England.

=== Date unknown ===
- Industrial Revolution in England:
  - The Iron Bridge is erected across the River Severn in Shropshire, the world's first bridge built entirely of cast iron. It will open to traffic on January 1, 1781.
  - The spinning mule is perfected by Lancashire inventor Samuel Crompton.
  - Boulton and Watt's Smethwick Engine, now the oldest working engine in the world, is brought into service (May).
- A joint Spanish-Portuguese survey of the Amazon basin begins to determine the boundary between the colonial possessions in South America; it continues until 1795.

== Births ==
1770

- February 21 – Georges Mouton, Marshal of France (d. 1838)
- March 2 – Louis-Gabriel Suchet, Marshal of France (d. 1826)
- March 20 – Friedrich Hölderlin, German writer (d. 1843)
- April 3 – Theodoros Kolokotronis, Greek general (d. 1843)
- April 7 – William Wordsworth, English poet (d. 1850)
- April 8 – John Campbell, Australian public servant, politician (d. 1830)
- April 11 – George Canning, Prime Minister of the United Kingdom (d. 1827)
- April 25 – Georg Sverdrup, Norwegian philologist (d. 1850)
- April 30 – David Thompson, English-Canadian explorer (d. 1857)
- May 10 – Louis-Nicolas Davout, Marshal of France (d. 1823)
- May 15 – Ezekiel Hart, Canadian entrepreneur, politician (d. 1843)
- May 27 – Ignaz Döllinger, German anatomist, physiologist (d. 1841)
- May 29 – Charles Adams, second son of President John Adams (1735–1826) (d. 1800)
- June 1 – Friedrich Laun, German author (d. 1849)

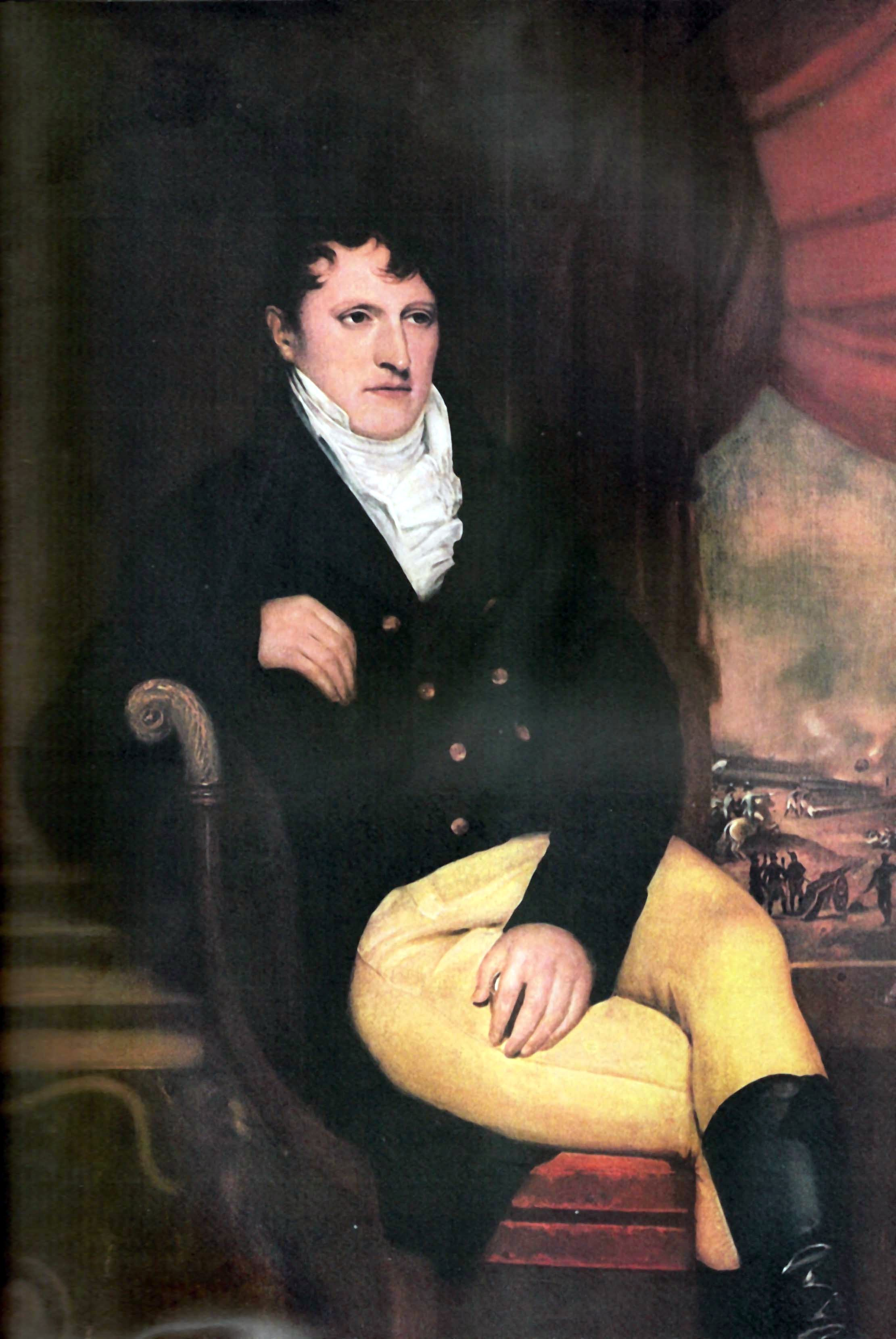
Manuel Belgrano

- June 3 – Manuel Belgrano, Argentine politician, general in the Independence War (d. 1820)
- June 4 – Eleonora Charlotta d'Albedyhll, Swedish countess, poet and salon holder (d. 1835)
- June 7 – Robert Jenkinson, 2nd Earl of Liverpool, Prime Minister of the United Kingdom (d. 1828)
- June 20 – Moses Waddel, American educator/minister and bestselling author (d. 1840)
- August 1 – William Clark, American explorer, Governor of Missouri Territory, and Superintendent of Indian Affairs (d. 1838)
- August 3 – King Frederick William III of Prussia (d. 1840)
- August 18 – Dorothea von Rodde-Schlözer, German scholar (d. 1825)

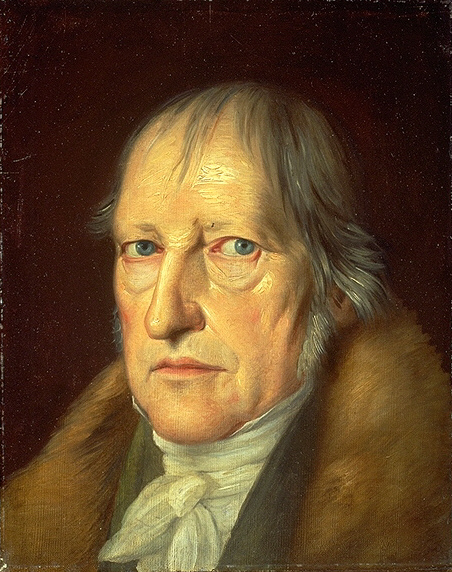
Georg Wilhelm Friedrich Hegel

- August 27 – Georg Wilhelm Friedrich Hegel, German philosopher (d. 1831)
- October 10 – Adam Johann von Krusenstern, Baltic German explorer who led the First Russian circumnavigation (d. 1846)
- October 18 – Thomas Phillips, English painter (d. 1845)
- November 5 – Sarah Guppy, English inventor (d. 1852)
- November 19 – Bertel Thorvaldsen, Danish-Icelandic sculptor (d. 1844)

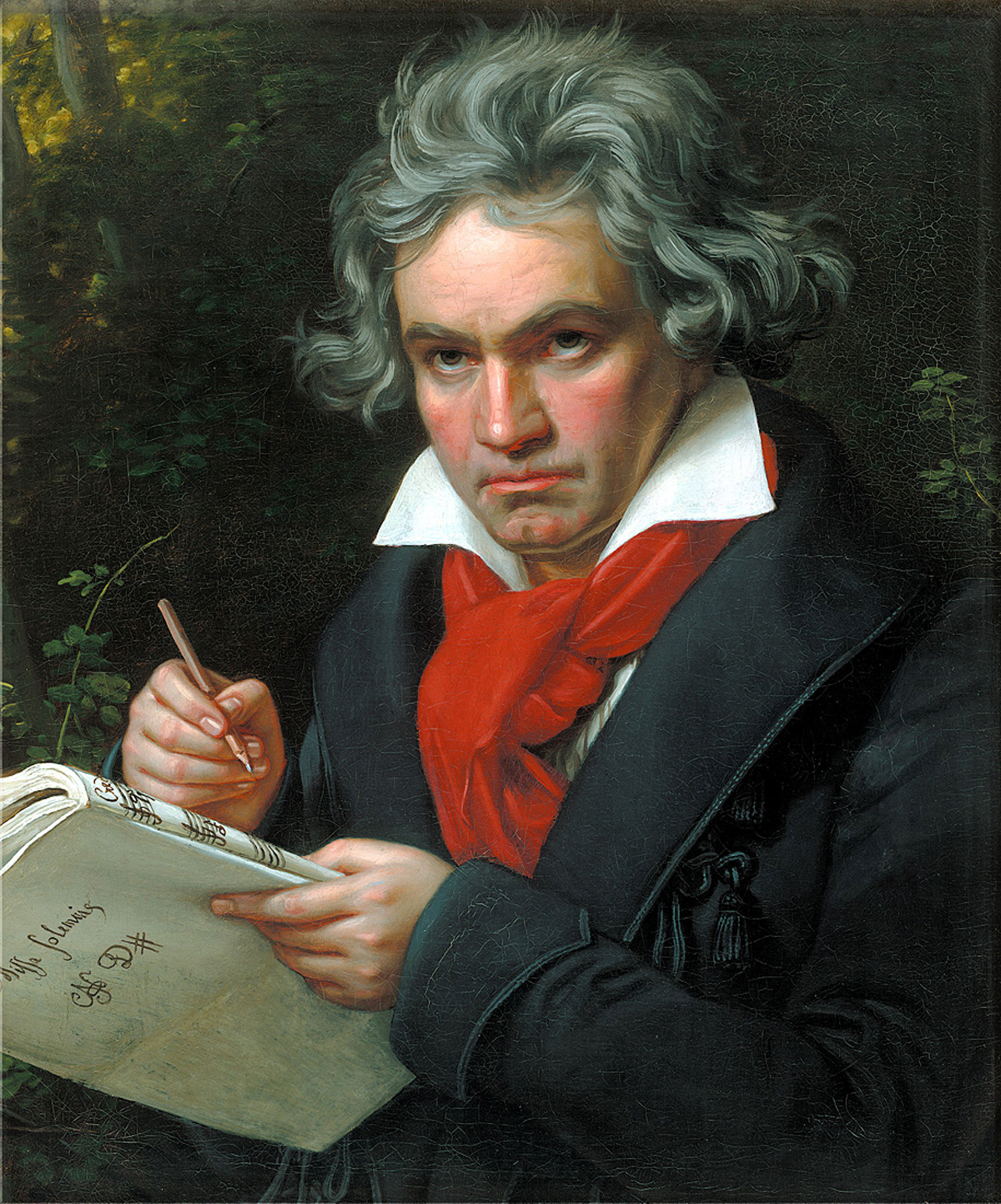
Ludwig van Beethoven

- December 17 (bapt.) – Ludwig van Beethoven, German classical composer (d. 1827)

1771

- February 14 – Hanne Tott, Danish circus artist, circus manager (d. 1826)
- March 16 – Antoine-Jean Gros, French painter (d. 1835)
- March 20 – Heinrich Clauren, German author (d. 1854)
- March 25 – Germanos III of Old Patras, Greek Metropolitan Bishop of Patras (d. 1826)
- April 3 – Hans Nielsen Huge, Norwegian revivalist, entrepreneur (d. 1824)
- April 13 – Richard Trevithick, English inventor (d. 1833)
- April 18 – Karl Philipp, Prince of Schwarzenberg, Austrian field marshal (d. 1820)
- April 27 – Jean Rapp, French general (d. 1821)
- May 1 – Cajsa Wahllund, Finnish restaurateur (d. 1843)
- May 11 – Laskarina Bouboulina, Greek independence heroine (d. 1825)

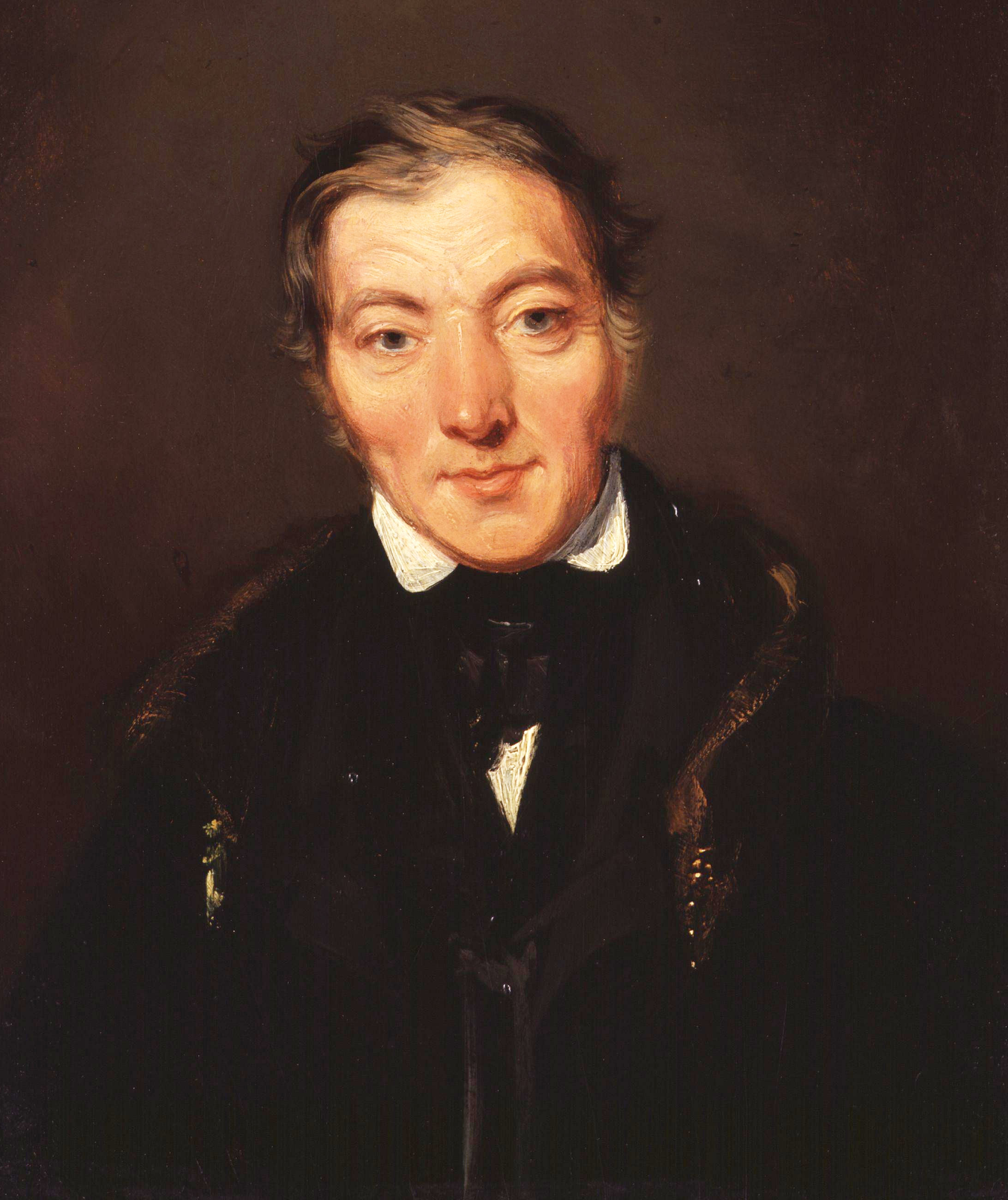
Robert Owen

- May 14 – Robert Owen, Welsh social reformer (d. 1858)
- May 16 – Louis Henri Loison, French general (d. 1816)

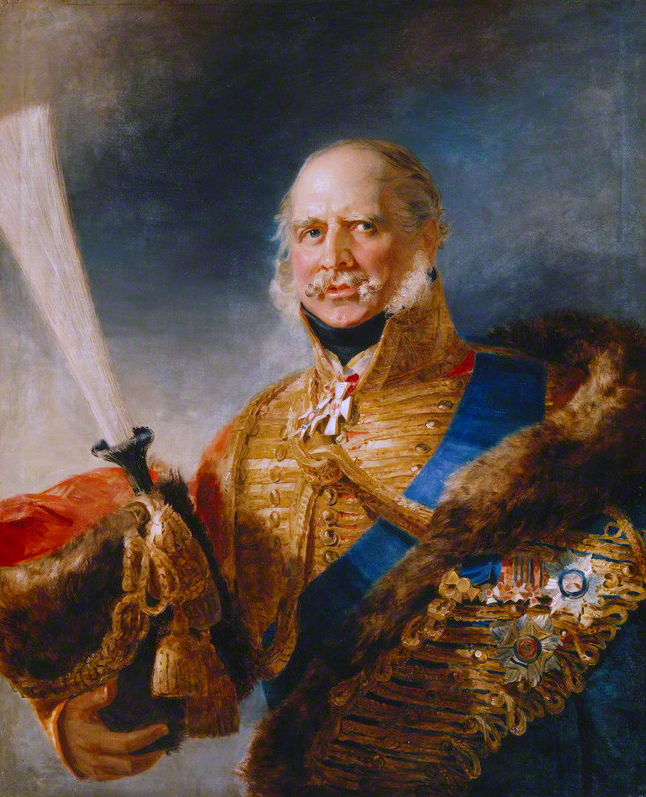
Ernest Augustus, King of Hanover

- June 5 – Ernest Augustus, King of Hanover (d. 1851)
- June 24 – Éleuthère Irénée du Pont, French-American chemist, industrialist (d. 1834)
- August 15 – Sir Walter Scott, Scottish novelist, poet (d. 1832)
- September 5 – Archduke Charles of Austria, Austrian general, statesman (d. 1847)
- September 11 – Mungo Park, Scottish explorer (d. 1806)
- September 17 – Johann August Apel, German writer, jurist (d. 1816)
- September 23 – Emperor Kōkaku of Japan (d. 1840)
- October 9 – Frederick William, Duke of Brunswick-Wolfenbüttel (d. 1815)
- October 23 – Jean-Andoche Junot, French general (d. 1813)
- November 14 – Xavier Bichat, French anatomist and pathologist (d. 1802)
- December 14 – Regina von Siebold, German physician and obstetrician (d. 1849)
- December 27 – William Johnson, Associate Justice of the Supreme Court of the United States (d. 1834)
- Unknown – William Lloyd, Welsh Anglican priest turned schoolteacher and Methodist preacher (d. 1841)

1772

- January 20 – Angélique Brûlon, French soldier, first female Knight of the French Legion of Honour (d. 1859)
- January 30 – Godfrey Higgins, British archaeologist (d. 1833)
- February 24 – William H. Crawford, American politician, judge (d. 1834)
- March 10 – Friedrich von Schlegel, German poet (d. 1829)
- March 15 – József Ficzkó, Burgenland Croatian writer (d. 1843)
- April 4 – Nachman of Breslov, Hasidic rabbi and founder of the Breslov Hasidic movement (d. 1810)
- April 5 – Domenico Puccini, Italian composer (d. 1815)
- April 7 – Charles Fourier, French philosopher (d. 1837)
- April 18 – David Ricardo, British economist (d. 1823)
- April 30 – Karl Gustav Himly, German surgeon, ophthalmologist (d. 1837)
- May 2 – Novalis, German poet (d. 1801)
- May 20 – William Congreve, British rocket pioneer (d. 1828)
- May 22 – Ram Mohan Roy, Hindu religious and social reformer (d. 1833)
- June 7 – Aurora Liljenroth, Swedish scholar (d. 1836)
- July 11 – John Rodgers, American naval officer (d. 1838)
- August 2 – Louis Antoine, Duke of Enghien (d. 1804)
- August 15 – Johann Nepomuk Mälzel, German inventor (d. 1838)

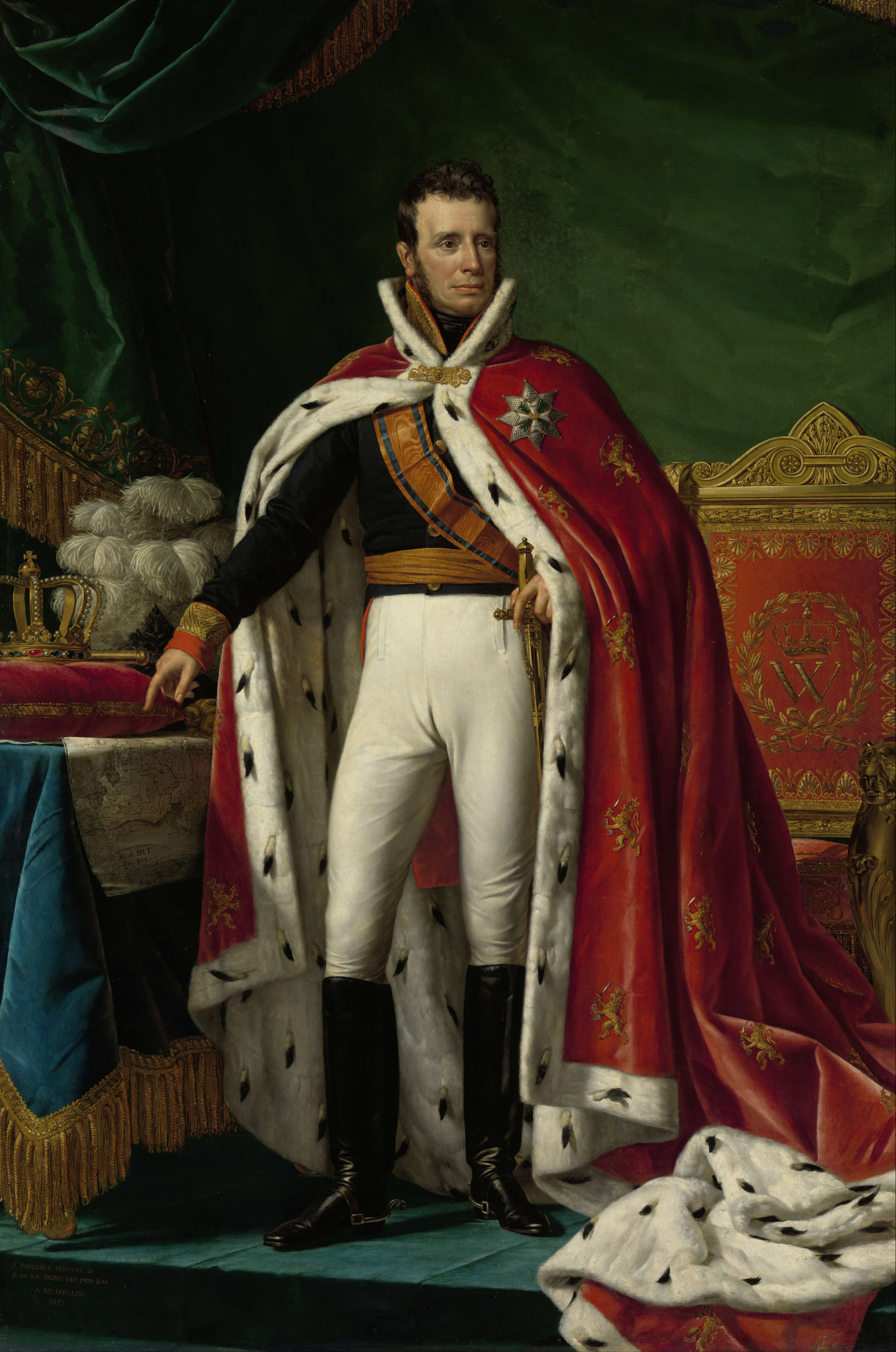
William I of the Netherlands

- August 24 – King William I of the Netherlands (d. 1843)
- September 27 – Martha Jefferson Randolph, Acting First Lady of the United States (1801–1809) (d. 1836)
- October 6 – Anna Maria Rüttimann-Meyer von Schauensee, politically active Swiss salonist (d. 1856)

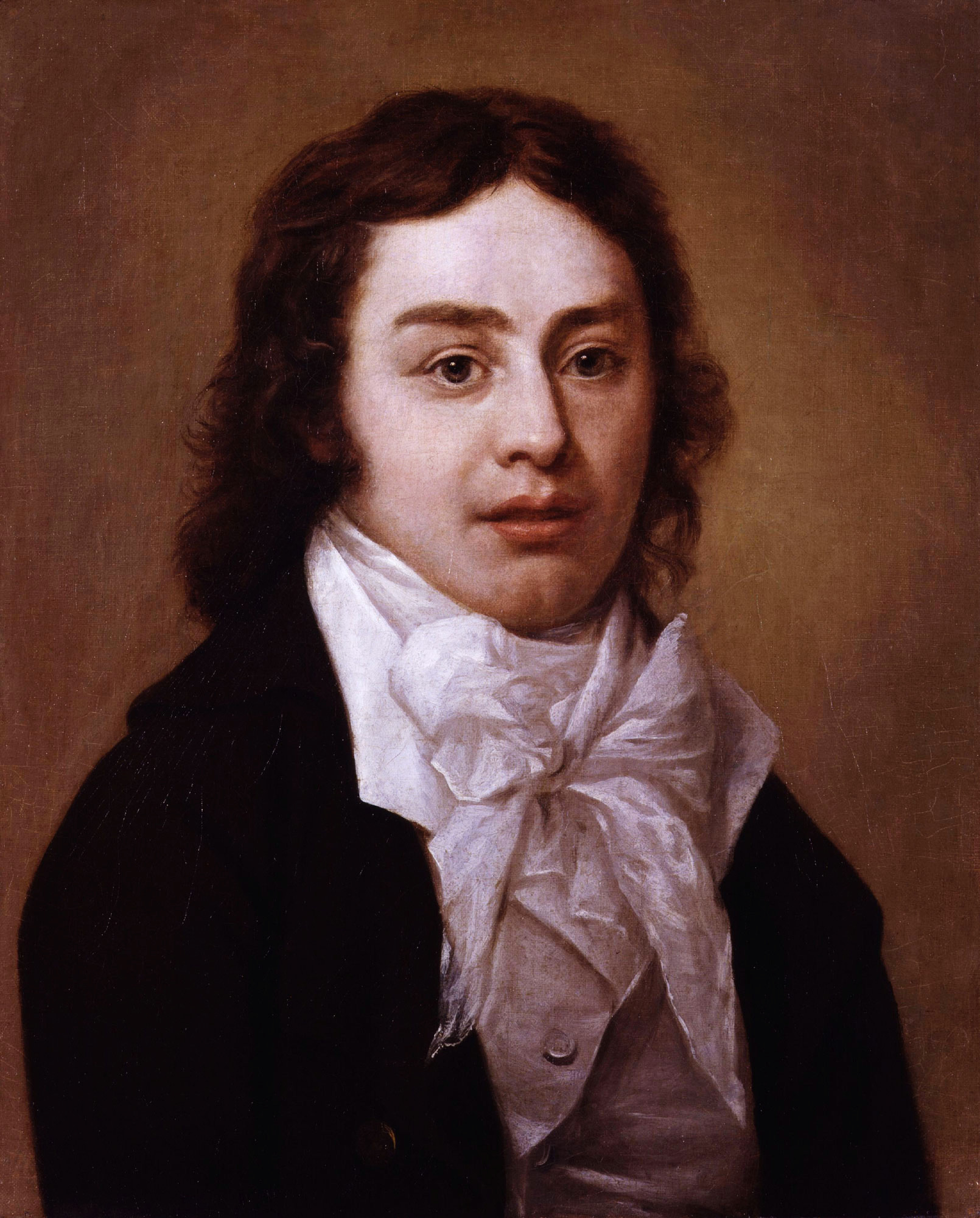
Samuel Taylor Coleridge

- October 21 – Samuel Taylor Coleridge, English poet and philosopher (d. 1834)
- October 25 – Géraud Duroc, French general (d. 1813)
- November 5 – Pierre Roch Jurien de La Gravière, French admiral (d. 1849)
- November 8 – William Wirt, 9th United States Attorney General (d. 1834)
- November 18 – Louis Ferdinand of Prussia, German prince (d. 1806)
- date unknown
  - Thomas Noble, English poet and translator (d. 1837)
  - Tuanku Imam Bonjol, Indonesian religious and military leader (d. 1864)
- approximate date
  - Charlotte Dacre, English Gothic novelist (d. 1825)
  - Lalon, Bengali philosopher, Baul saint, mystic, songwriter, social reformer and thinker (d. 1890)

1773

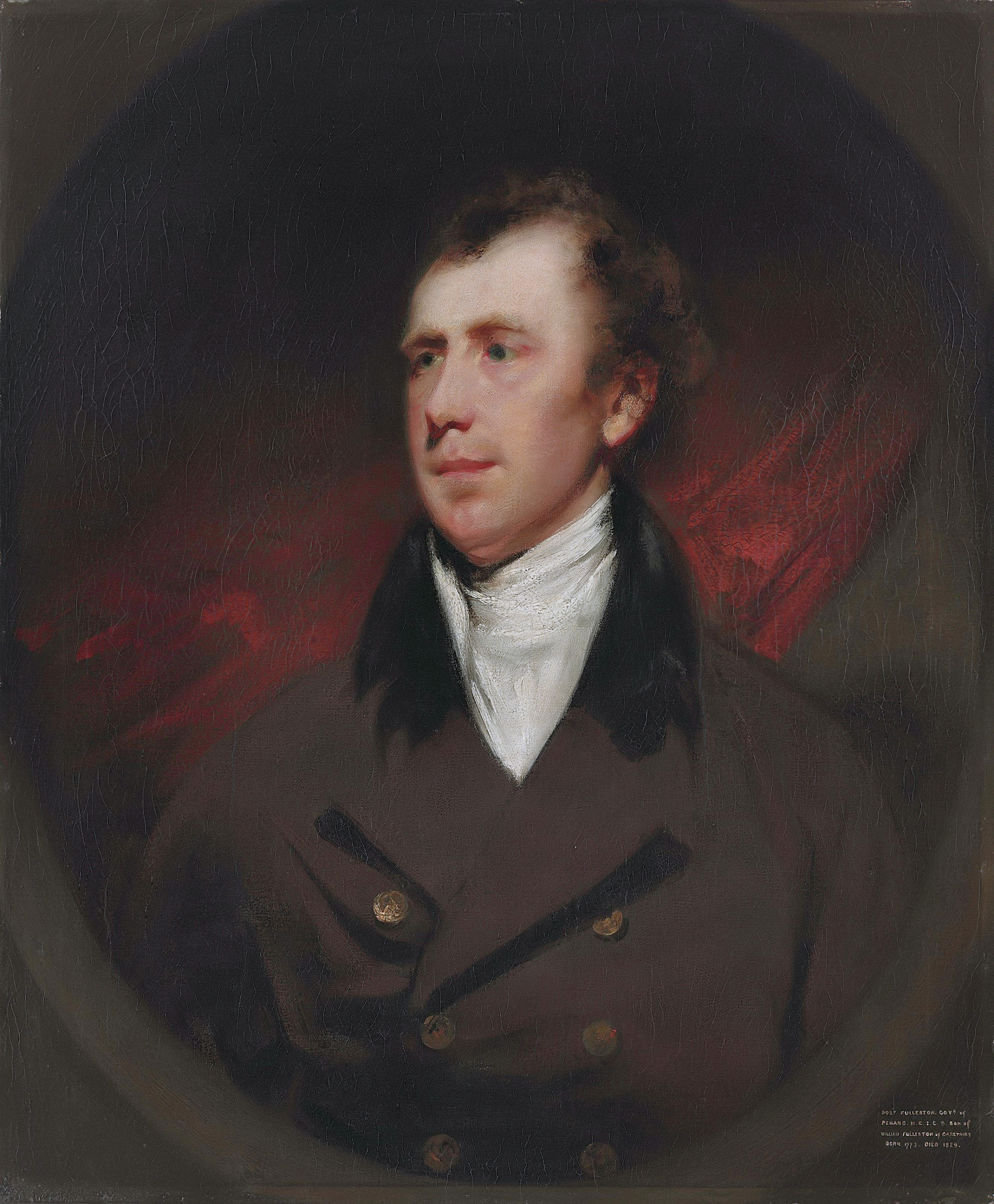
Robert Fullerton

- January 14 – William Amherst, 1st Earl Amherst, British ambassador to China, Governor-General of India (d. 1857)
- January 16 – Robert Fullerton, governor of Penang, first governor of British Straits Settlements (d. 1831)
- January 27 – Prince Augustus of Great Britain, Duke of Sussex (d. 1843)
- January 29 – Friedrich Mohs, German geologist, mineralogist (d. 1839)

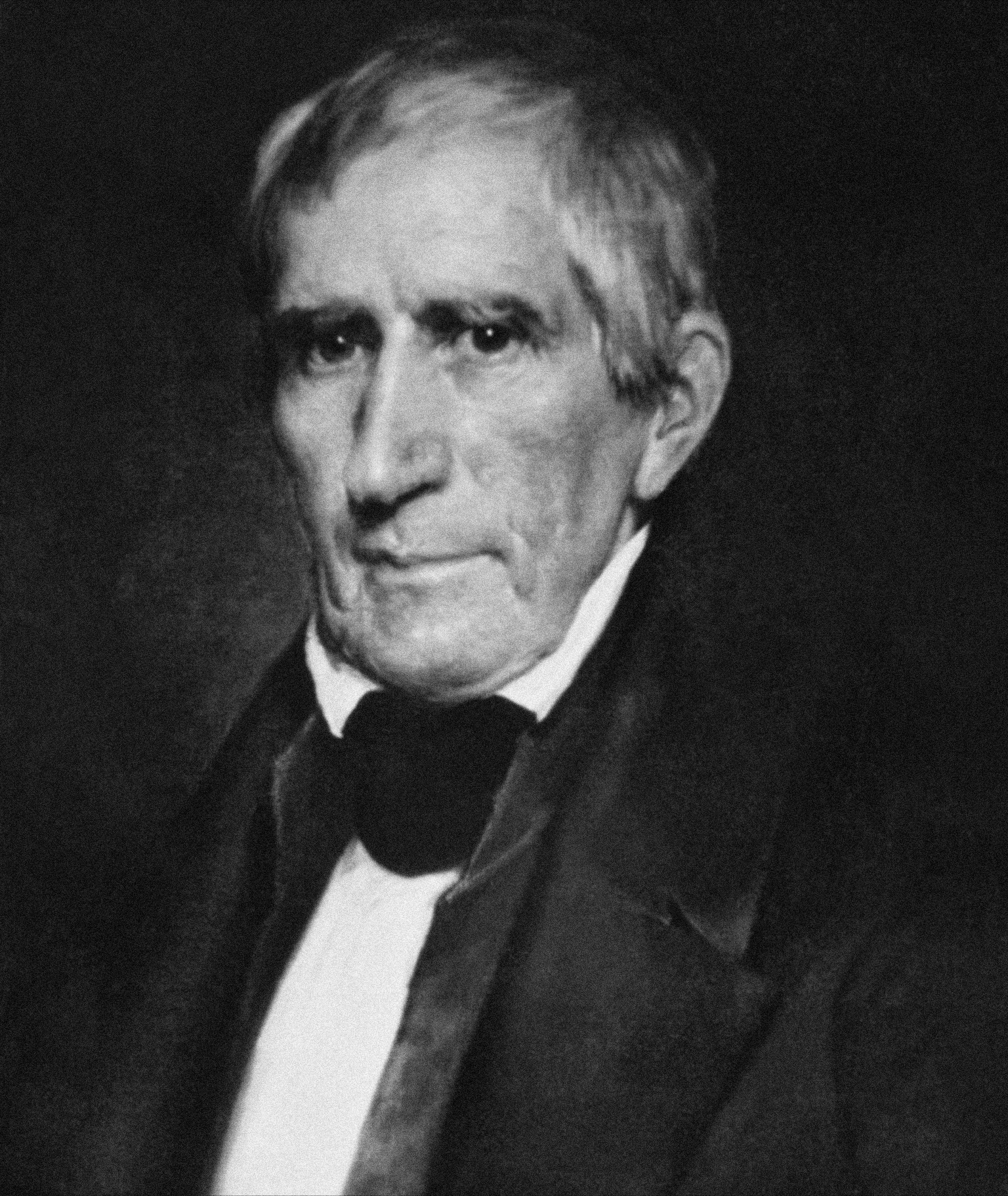
William Henry Harrison

- February 9 – William Henry Harrison, American military leader and ninth President of the United States (d. 1841)
- March 14 – John Holmes, American politician (d. 1843)
- March 16 – Juan Ramón Balcarce, Argentine military leader and politician (d. 1836)
- March 26 – Nathaniel Bowditch, American mathematician (d. 1838)
- April 4 – Étienne Maurice Gérard, Prime Minister and Marshal of France (d. 1852)
- April 9
  - Étienne Aignan, French writer, librettist, and playwright (d. 1824)
  - Marie Boivin, French midwife, inventor and obstetrics writer (d. 1841)
- April 14 – Jean-Baptiste de Villèle, Prime Minister of France (d. 1854)
- May 2 – Henrik Steffens, Norwegian philosopher (d. 1845)
- May 3 – Giuseppe Acerbi, Italian explorer (d. 1846)

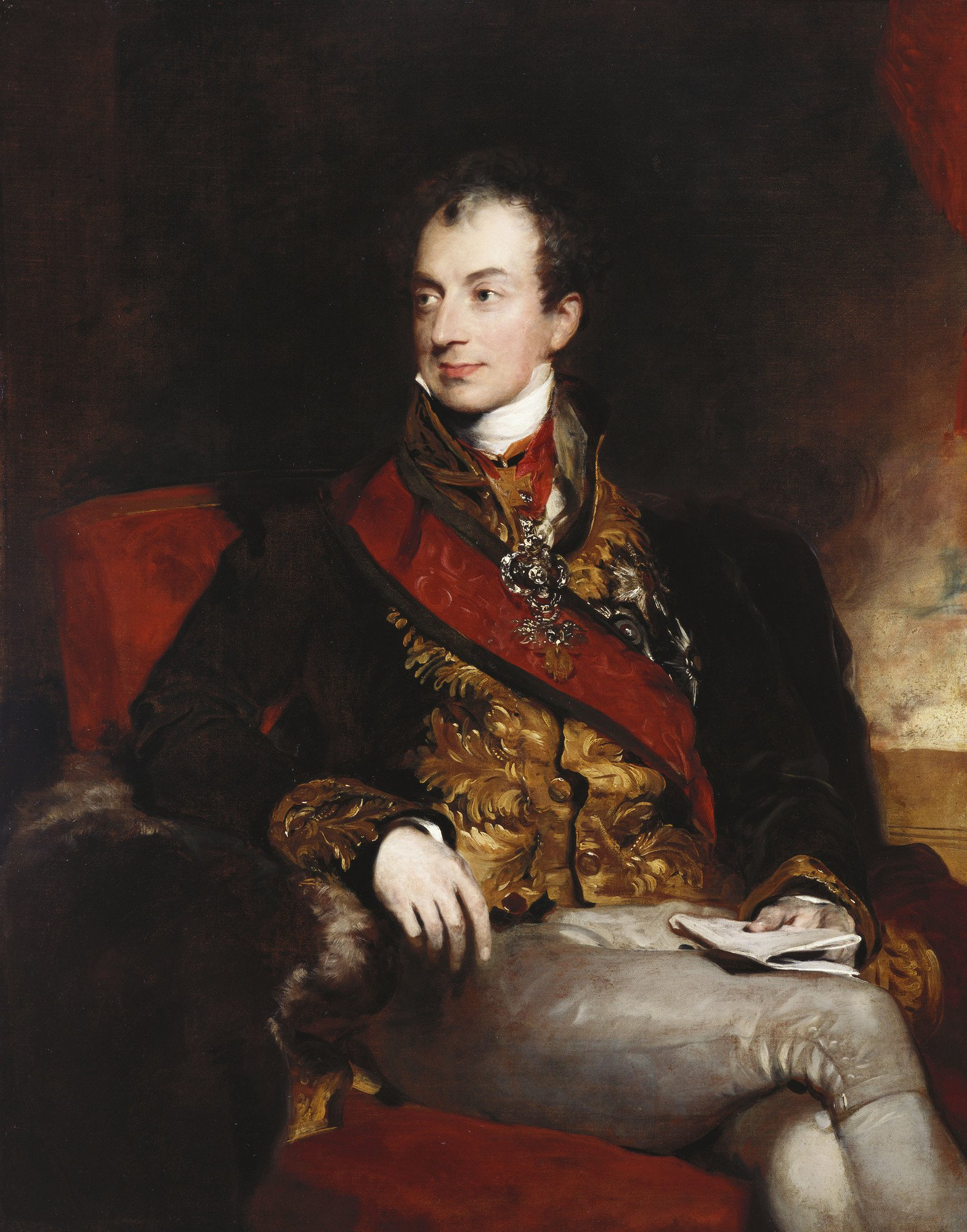
Klemens von Metternich

- May 15 – Prince Klemens Wenzel von Metternich, Austrian statesman (d. 1859)
- May 19 – Arthur Aikin, English chemist and mineralogist (d. 1854)
- May 31 – Ludwig Tieck, German writer (d. 1853)
- June 13 – Thomas Young, English scientist (d. 1829)
- July 23 – Thomas Brisbane, Scottish astronomer, Governor of New South Wales (d. 1860)
- August 12 – Karl Faber, German historian (d. 1853)
- August 22 – Aimé Bonpland, French explorer, botanist (d. 1858)
- September 17 – Jonathan Alder, American settler (d. 1849)

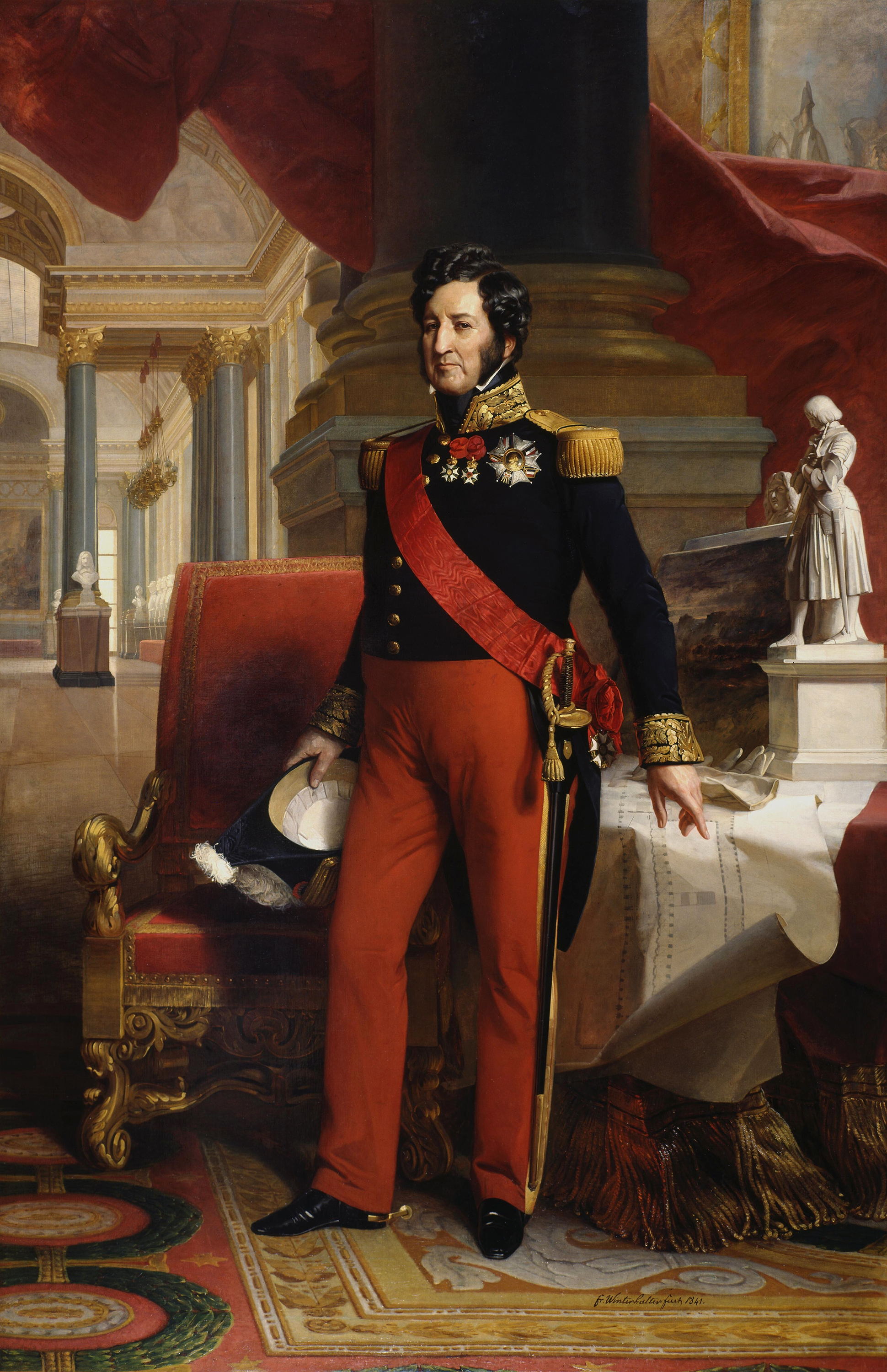
Louis Philippe I

- October 4 – Harriet Auber, English poet, hymnist (d. 1862)
- October 6 – Louis Philippe I, King of the French (d. 1850)
- November 6 – Henry Hunt, British politician (d. 1835)
- November 24 – Shadrach Bond, American politician and the first governor of Illinois (d. 1832)
- December 9 – Armand Augustin Louis de Caulaincourt, French general, diplomat (d. 1827)
- December 17 – Sylvain Charles Valée, Marshal of France (d. 1846)
- December 21 – Robert Brown, Scottish botanist (d. 1858)
- December 27 – Sir George Cayley, English aviation pioneer (d. 1857)
- Unknown – Johann Gottfried Arnold, German cellist (d. 1806)
- Unknown – Kyra Frosini, Greek heroine (d. 1800)
- Unknown – Isabel Zendal, Spanish nurse
- Unknown – Anna Moór, Hungarian actress (d. 1841)

1774

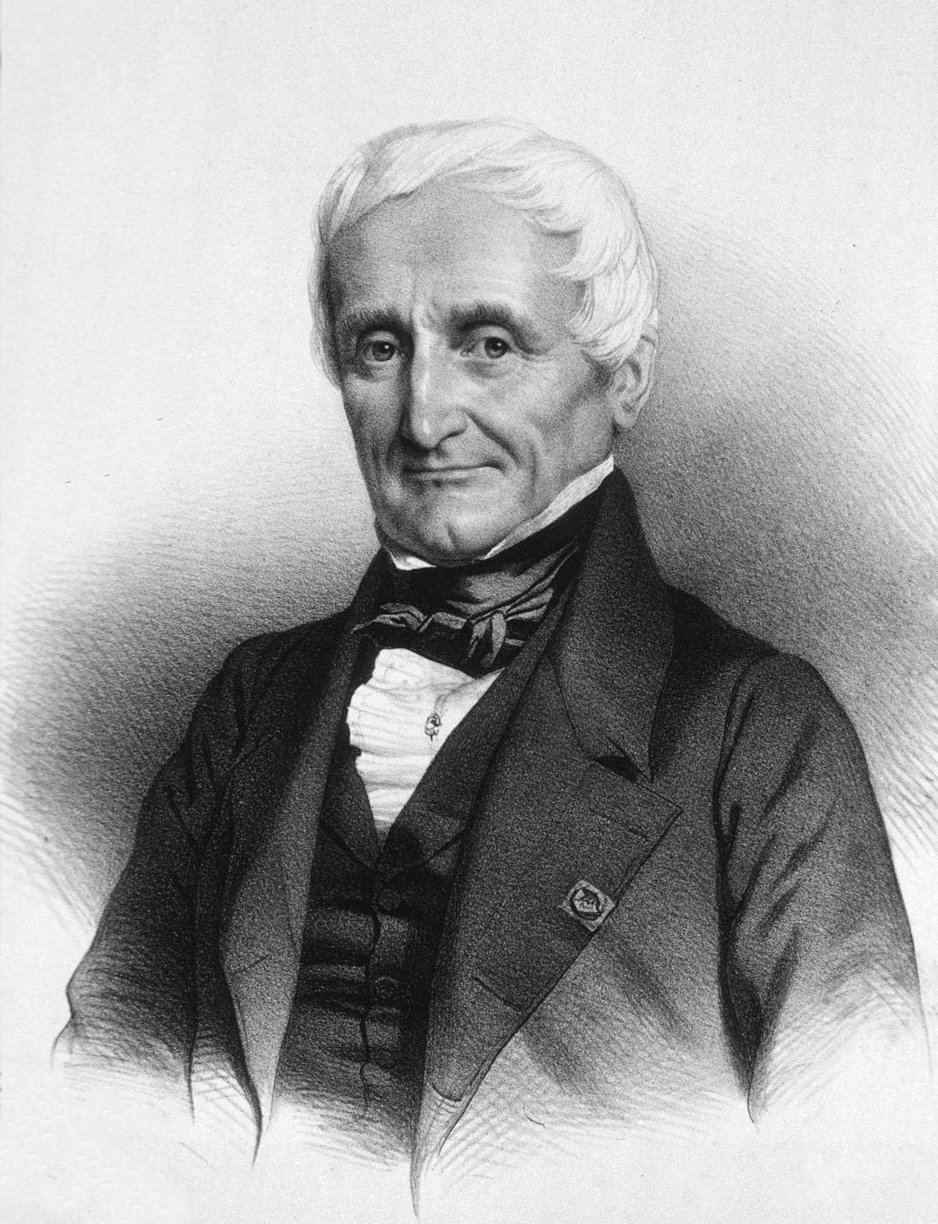
André Marie Constant Duméril born 1 January

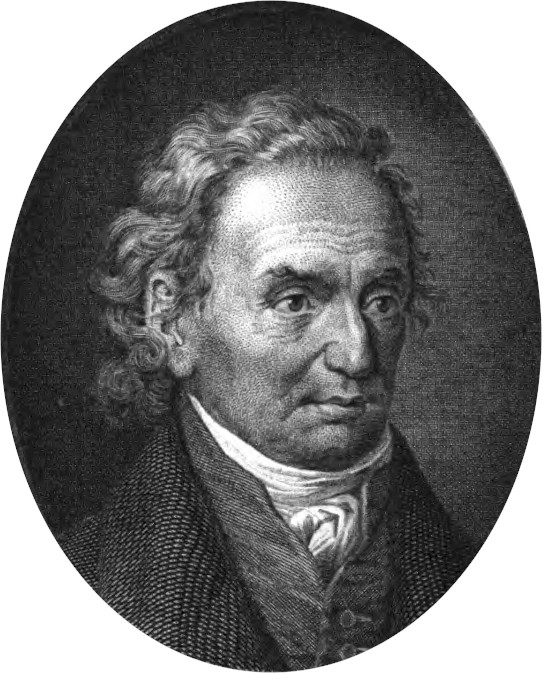
Pietro Giordani born 1 January

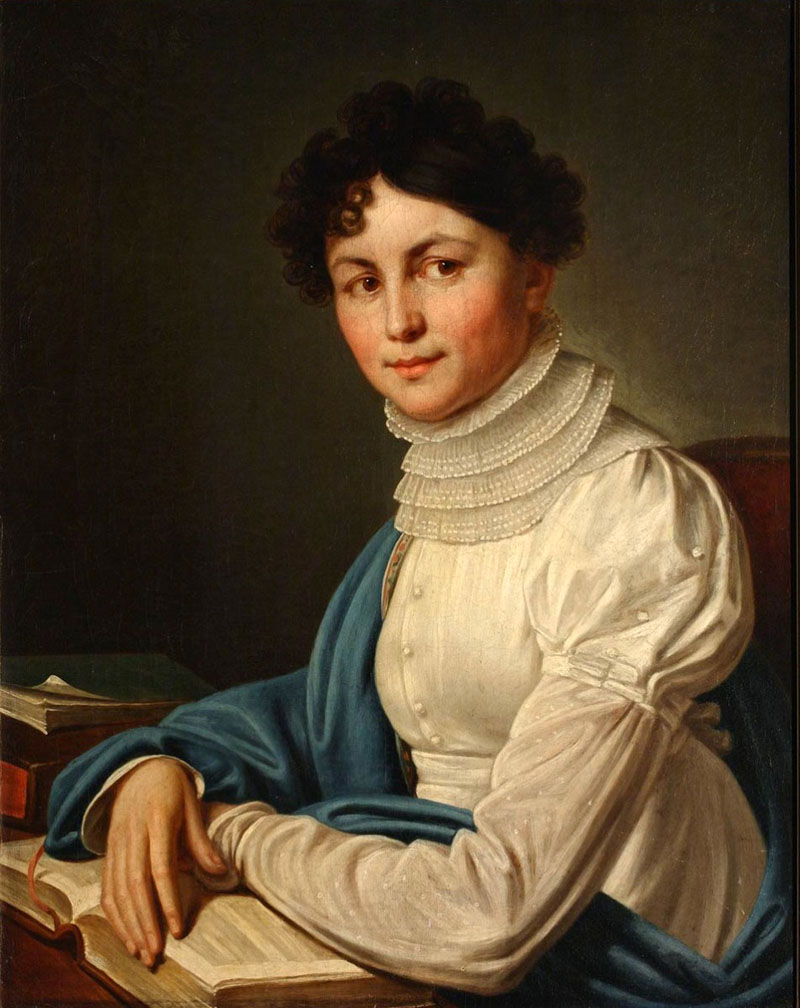
Anna Bunina born 7 January

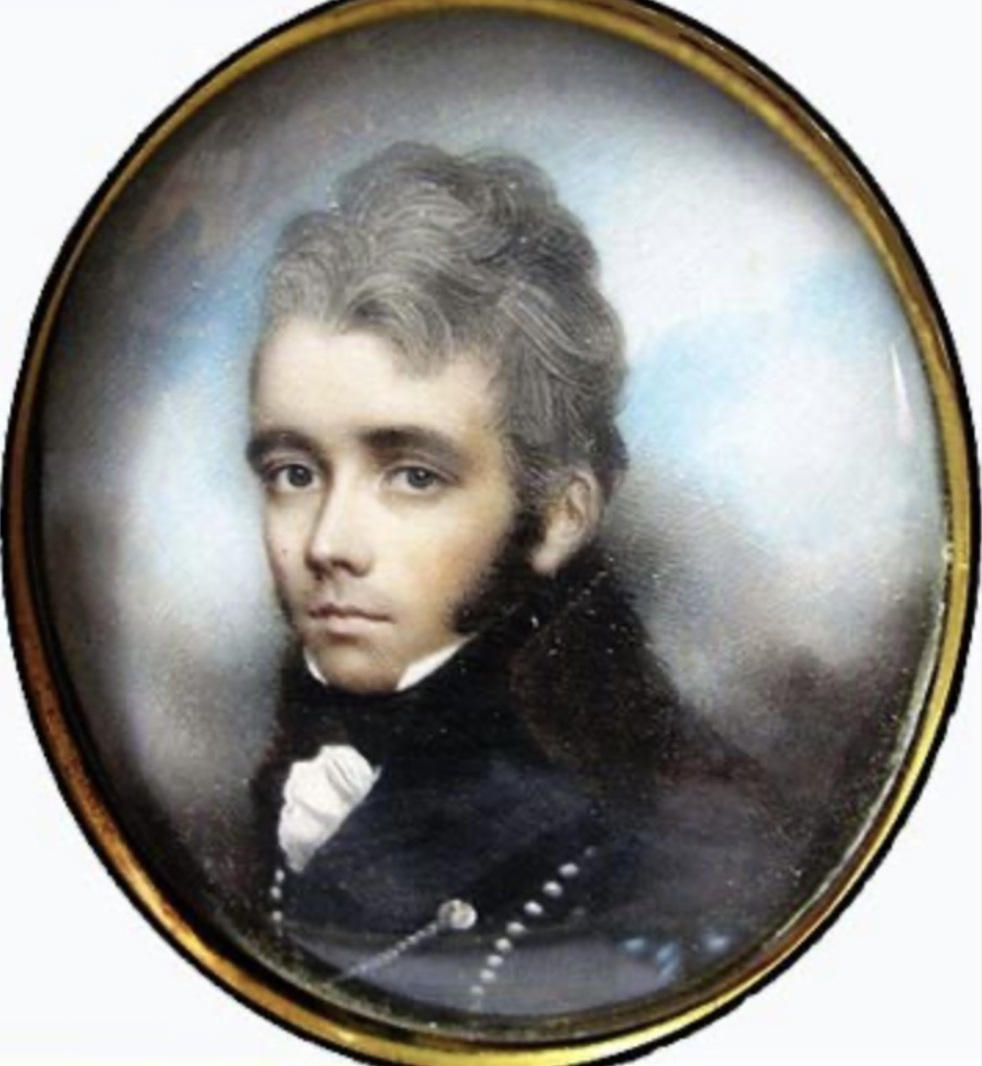
William Stewart born 10 January

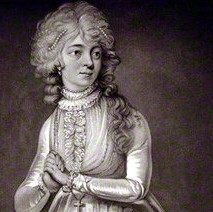
Tryphosa Jane Wallis born 11 January

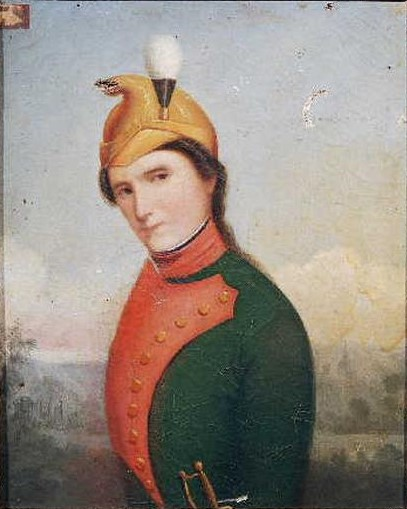
Marie-Thérèse Figueur born 17 January

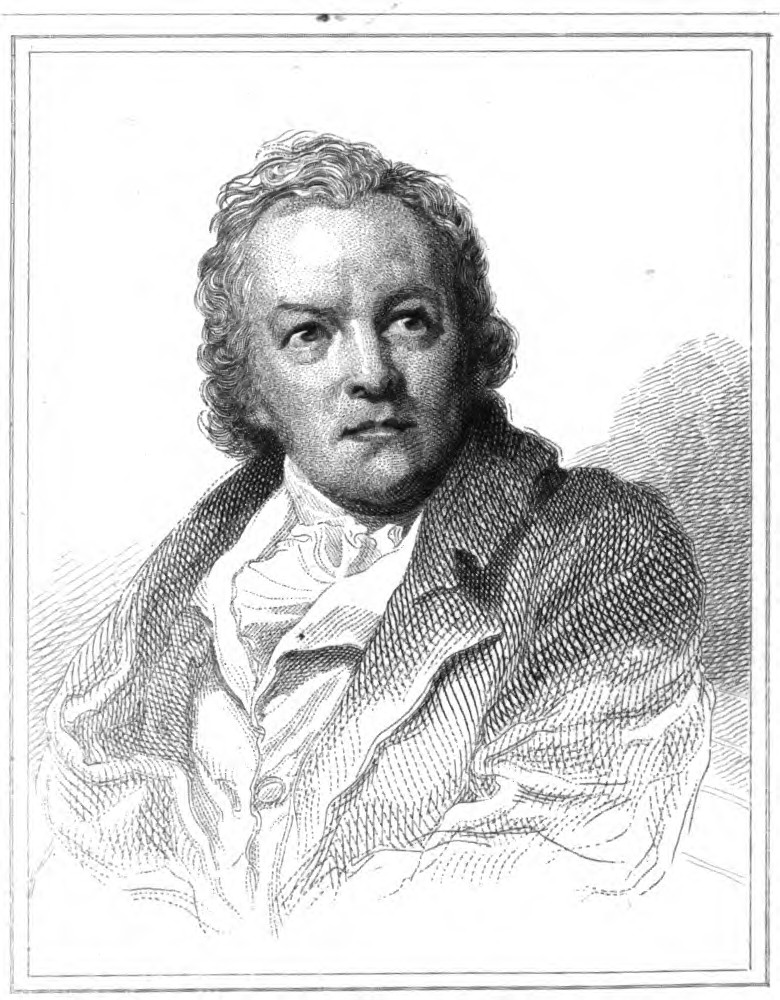
William Blake (economist) born 31 January

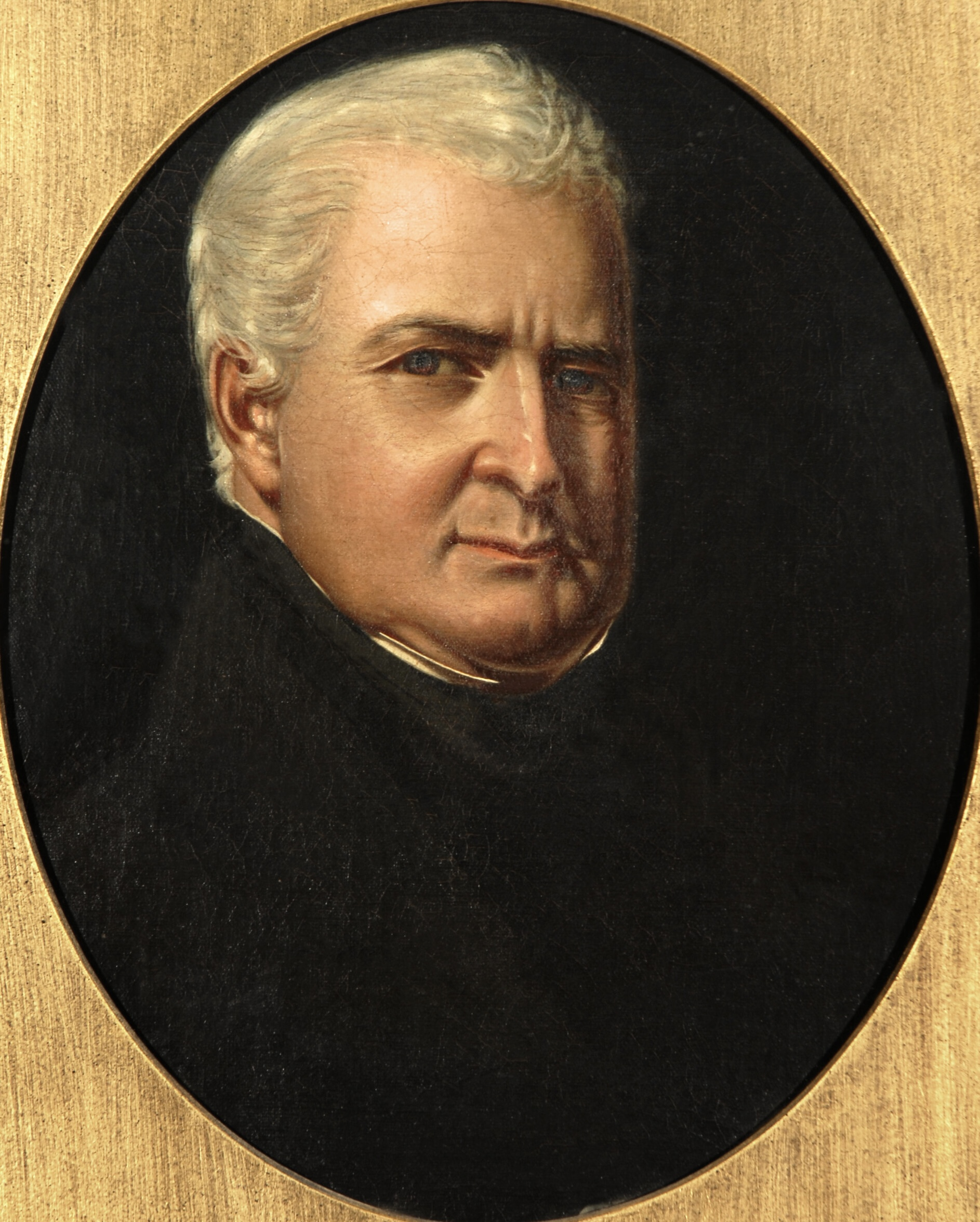
Thomas Veazey born 31 January

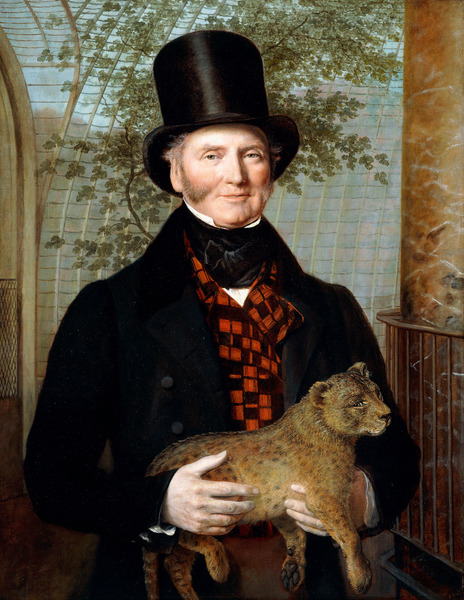
Edward Cross (zoo proprietor) born 3 February

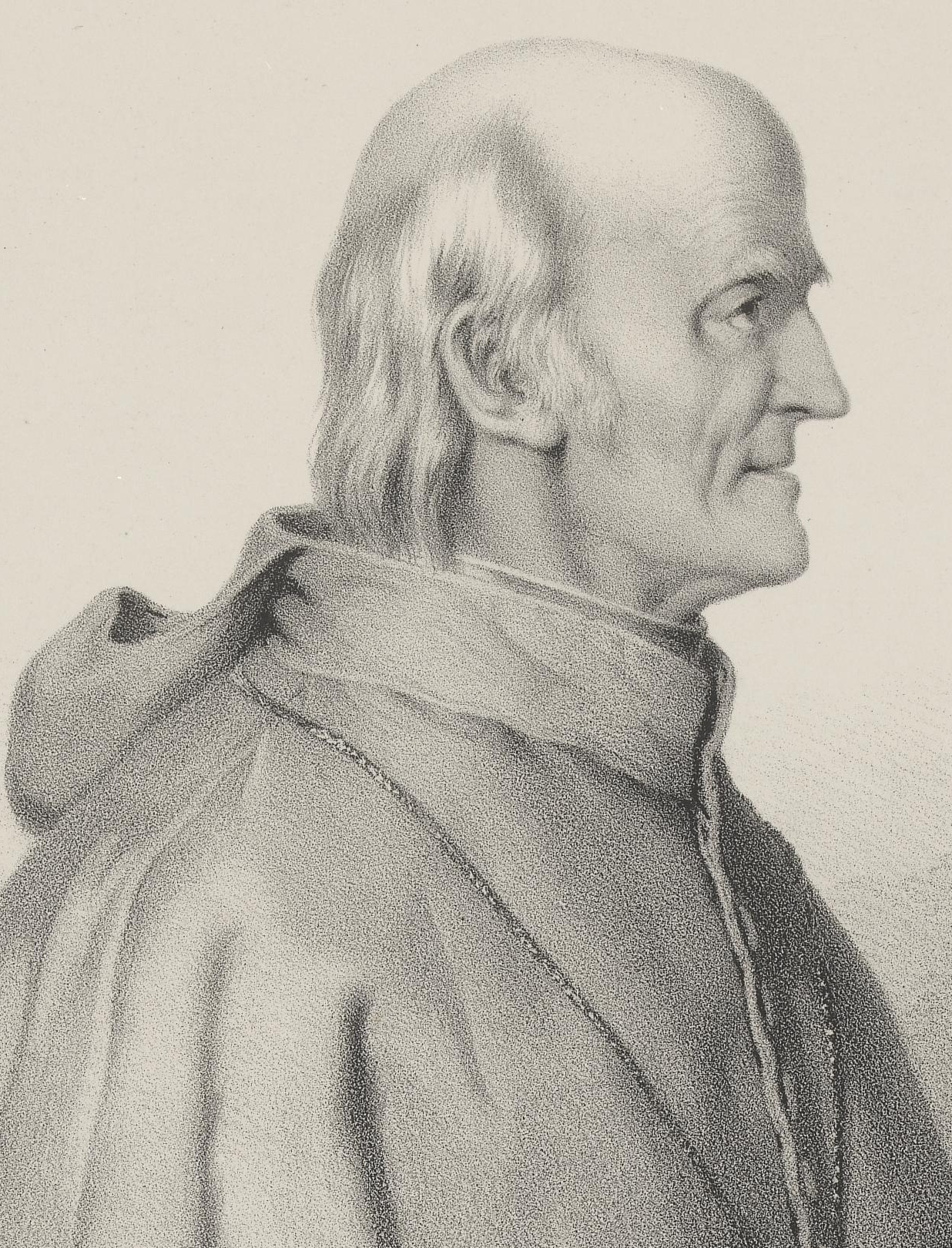
Valentin Stanič born 12 February

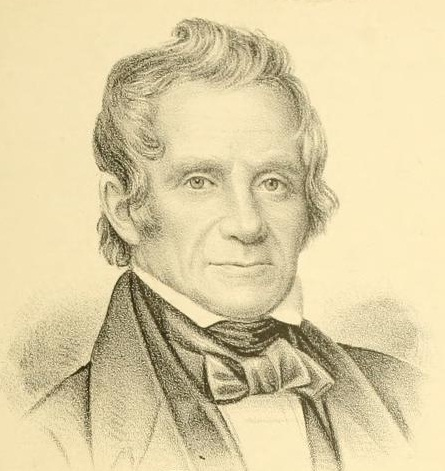
Roswell Weston born 24 February

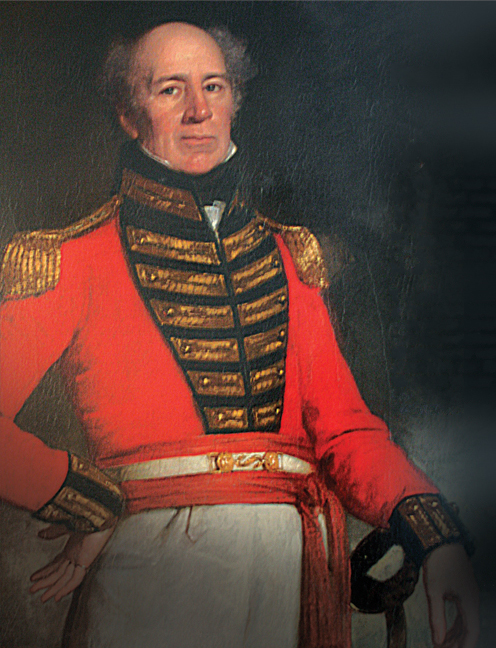
William Farquhar born 26 February

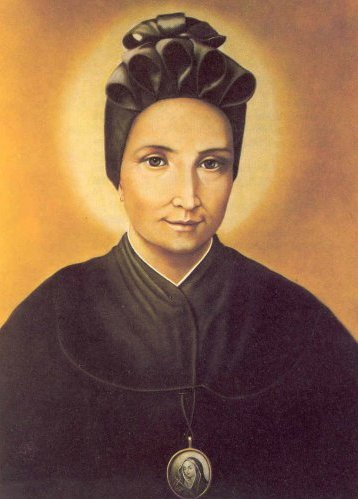
Magdalene of Canossa born 1 March

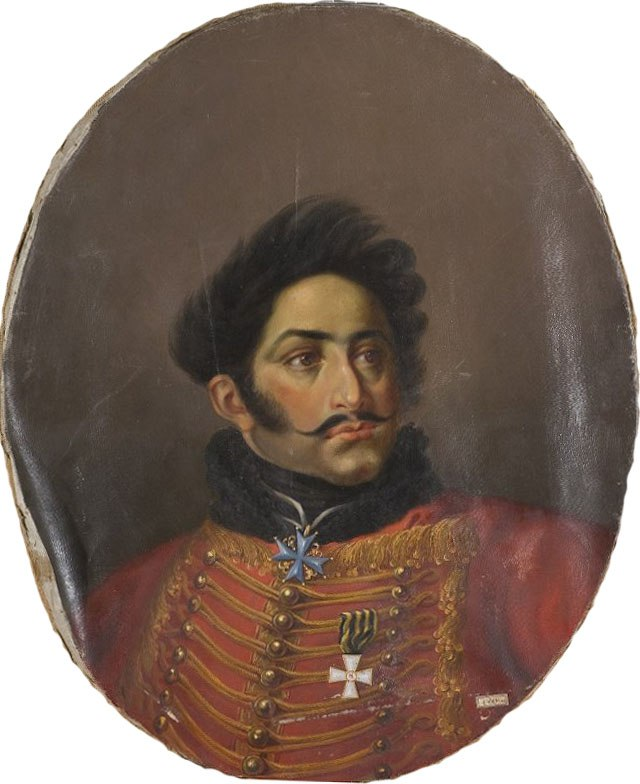
David Semyonovich Abamelik born 10 March

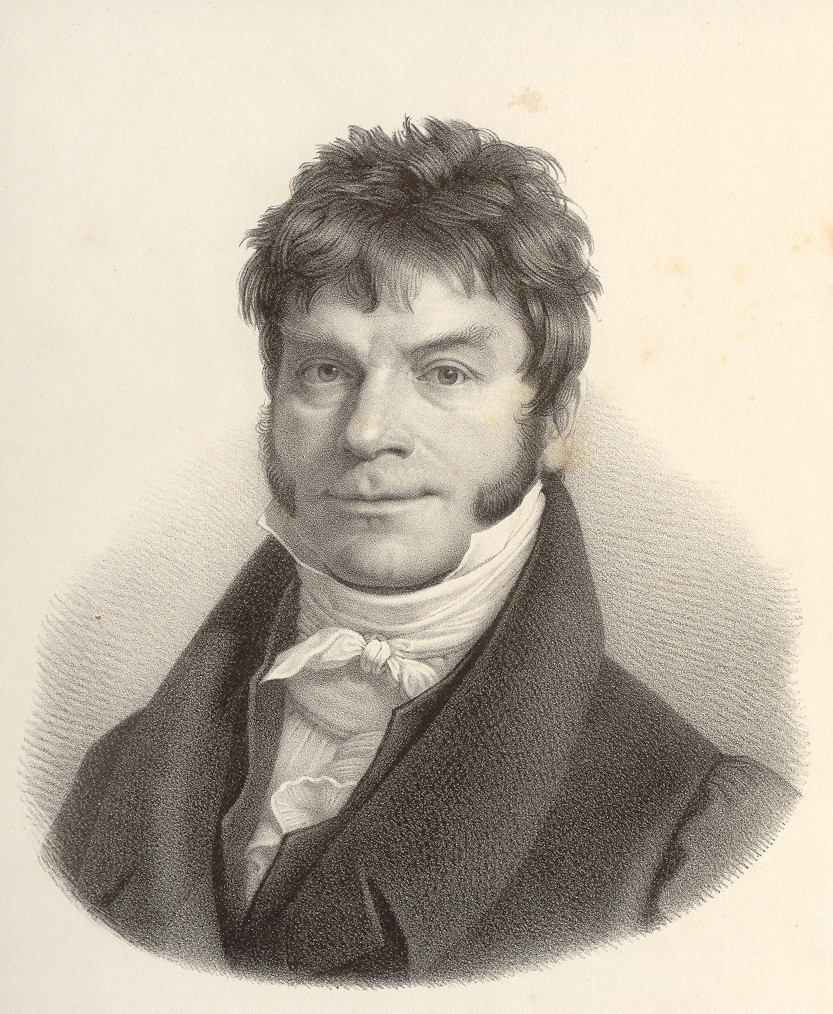
Johann Caspar Horner born 12 March

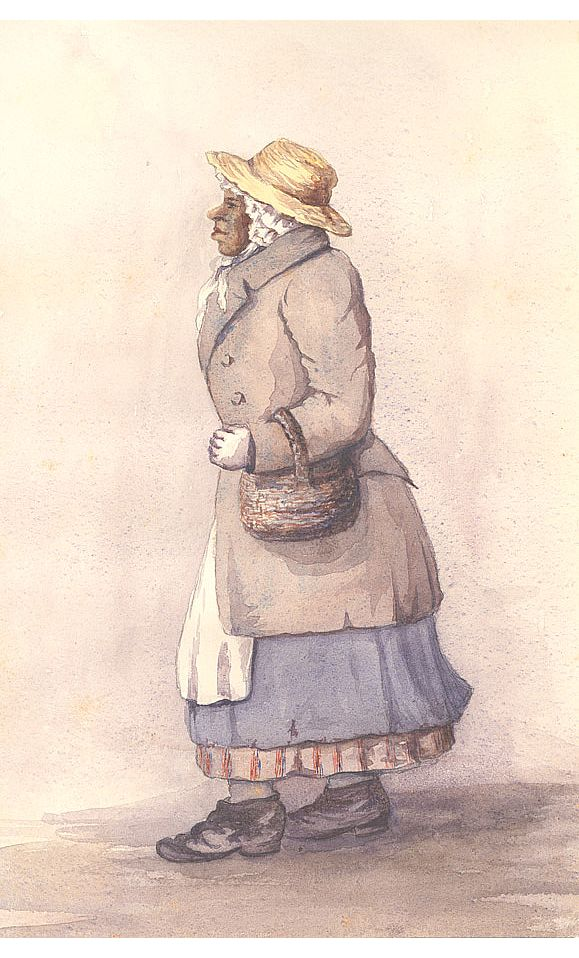
Rose Fortune born 13 March

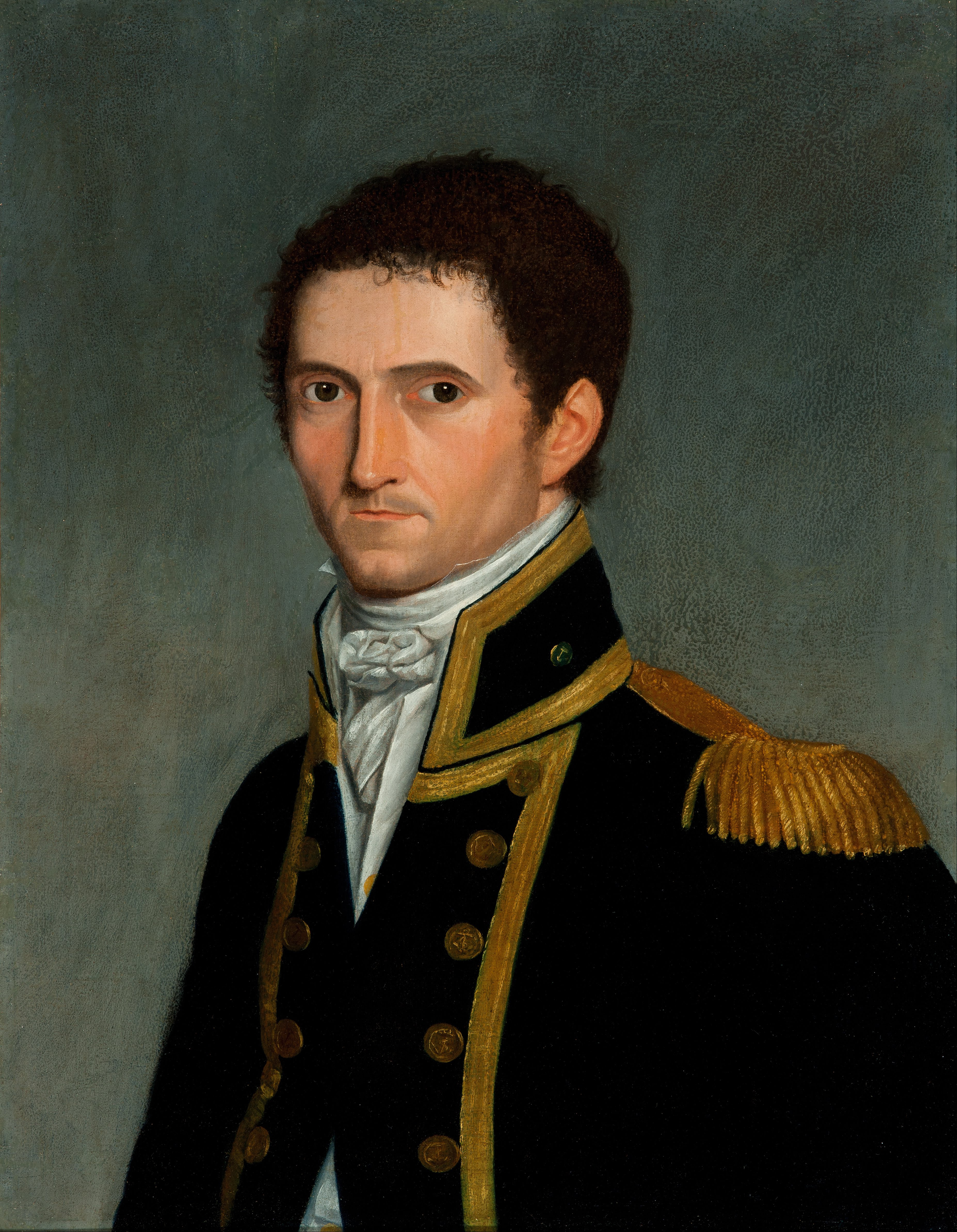
Matthew Flinders born 16 March

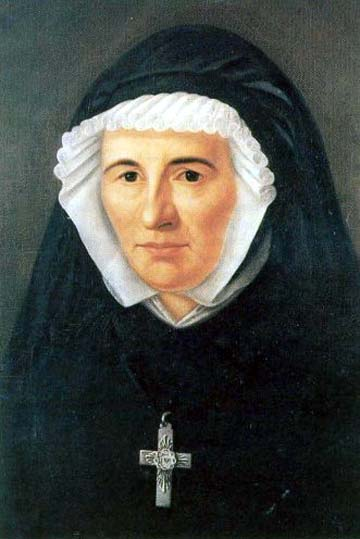
Claudine Thévenet born 30 March

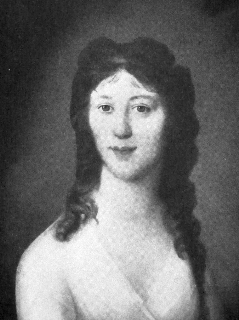
Sophie Thalbitzer born 15 April

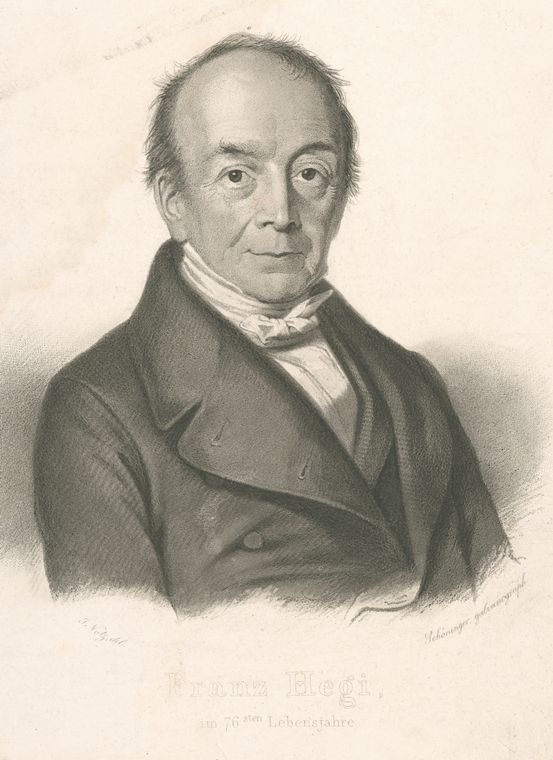
Franz Hegi born 16 April

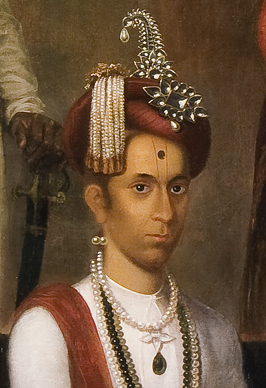
Madhavrao II born 18 April

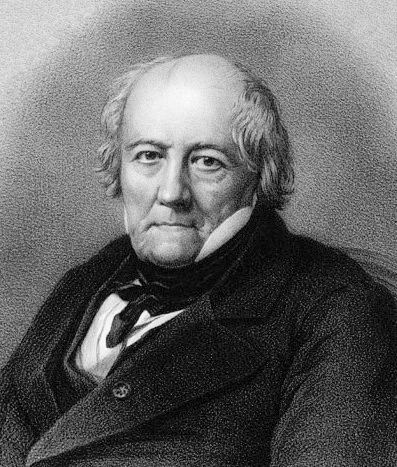
Jean-Baptiste Biot born 21 April

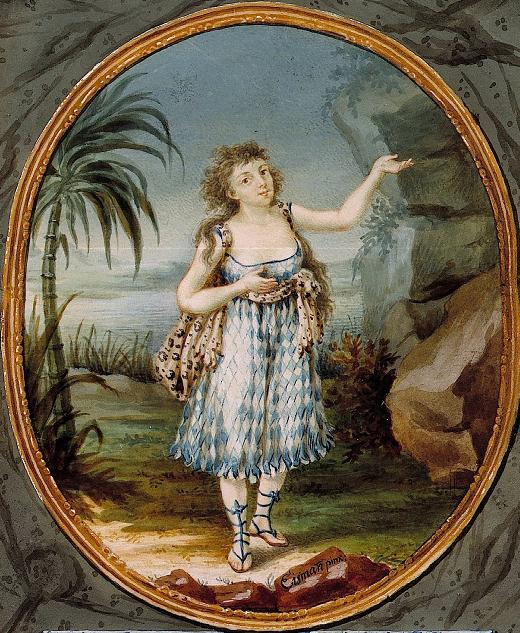
Anna Gottlieb born 29 April

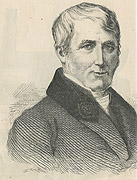
Samuel Owen (engineer) born 12 May

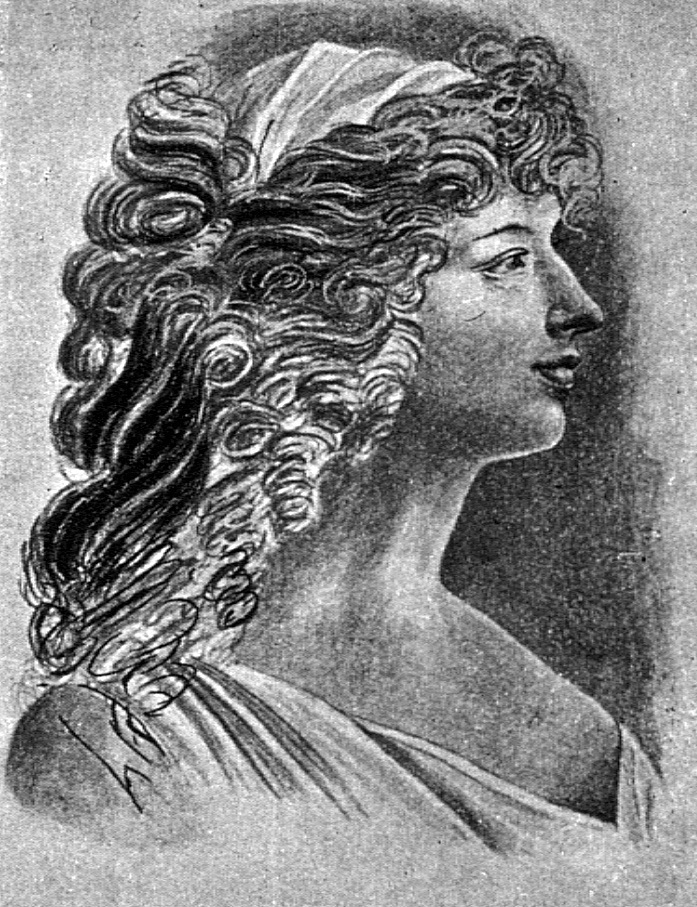
Friederike von Reden born 12 May

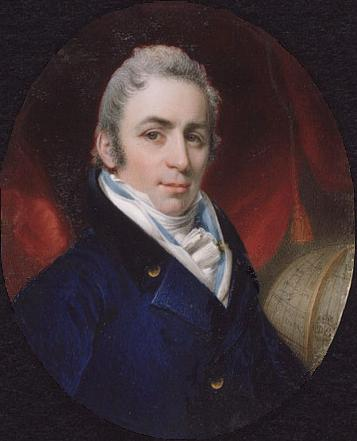
Joseph Bouchette born 14 May

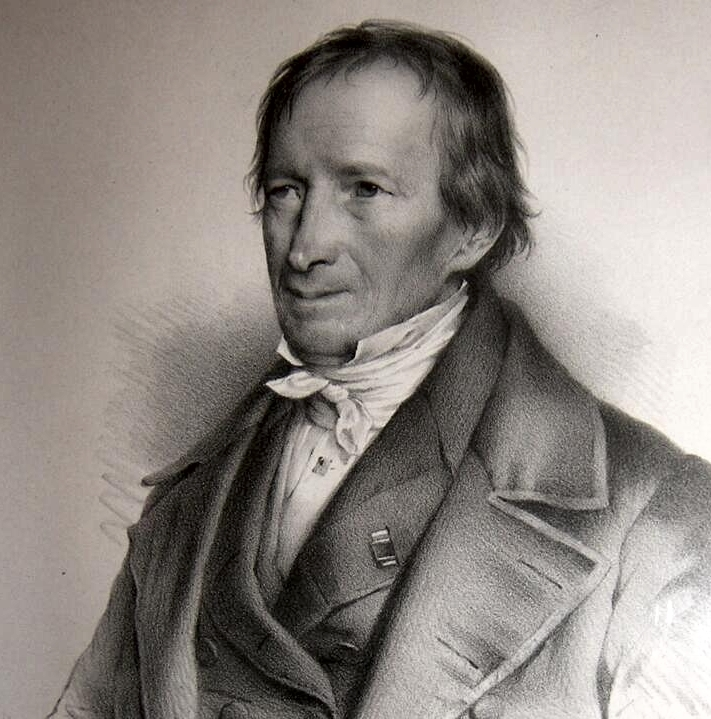
Johann Nepomuk von Fuchs born 15 May

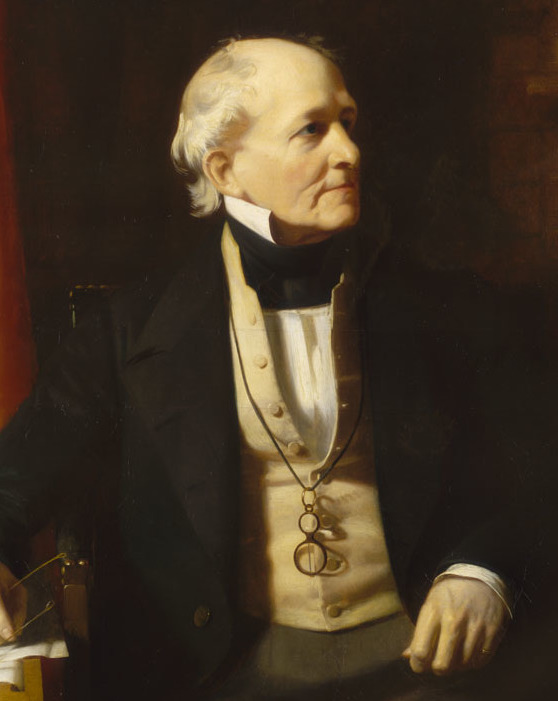
Francis Beaufort born 27 May

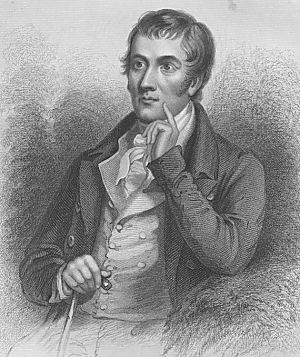
Robert Tannahill born 3 June

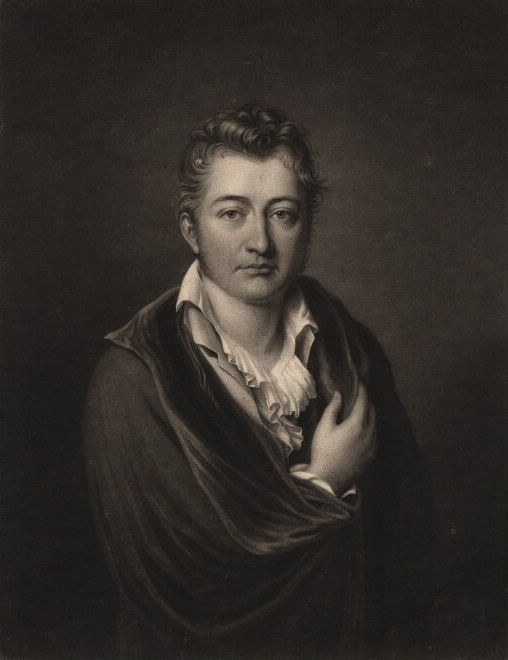
Henry Philip Hope born 8 June

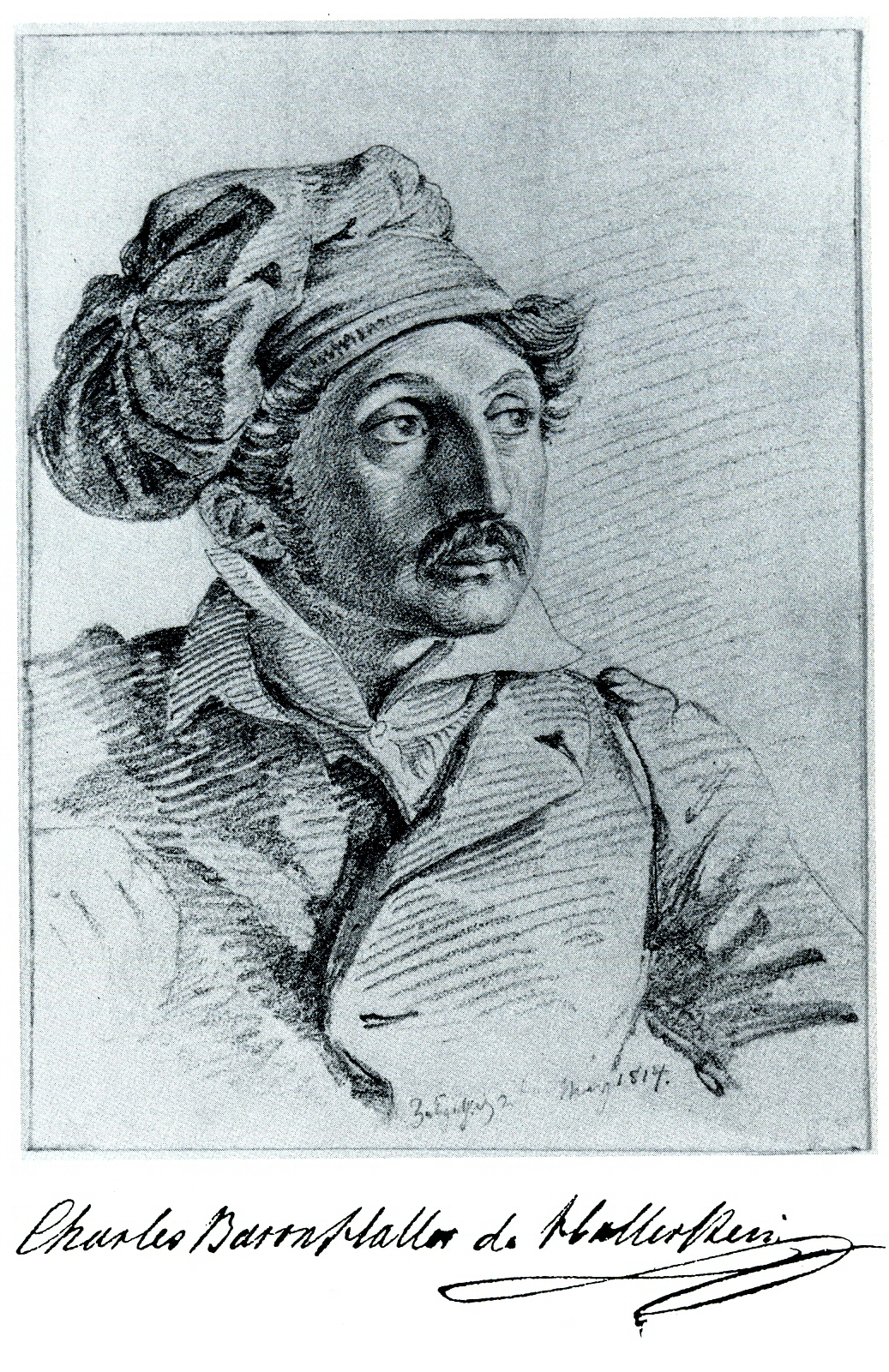
Carl Haller von Hallerstein born 10 June

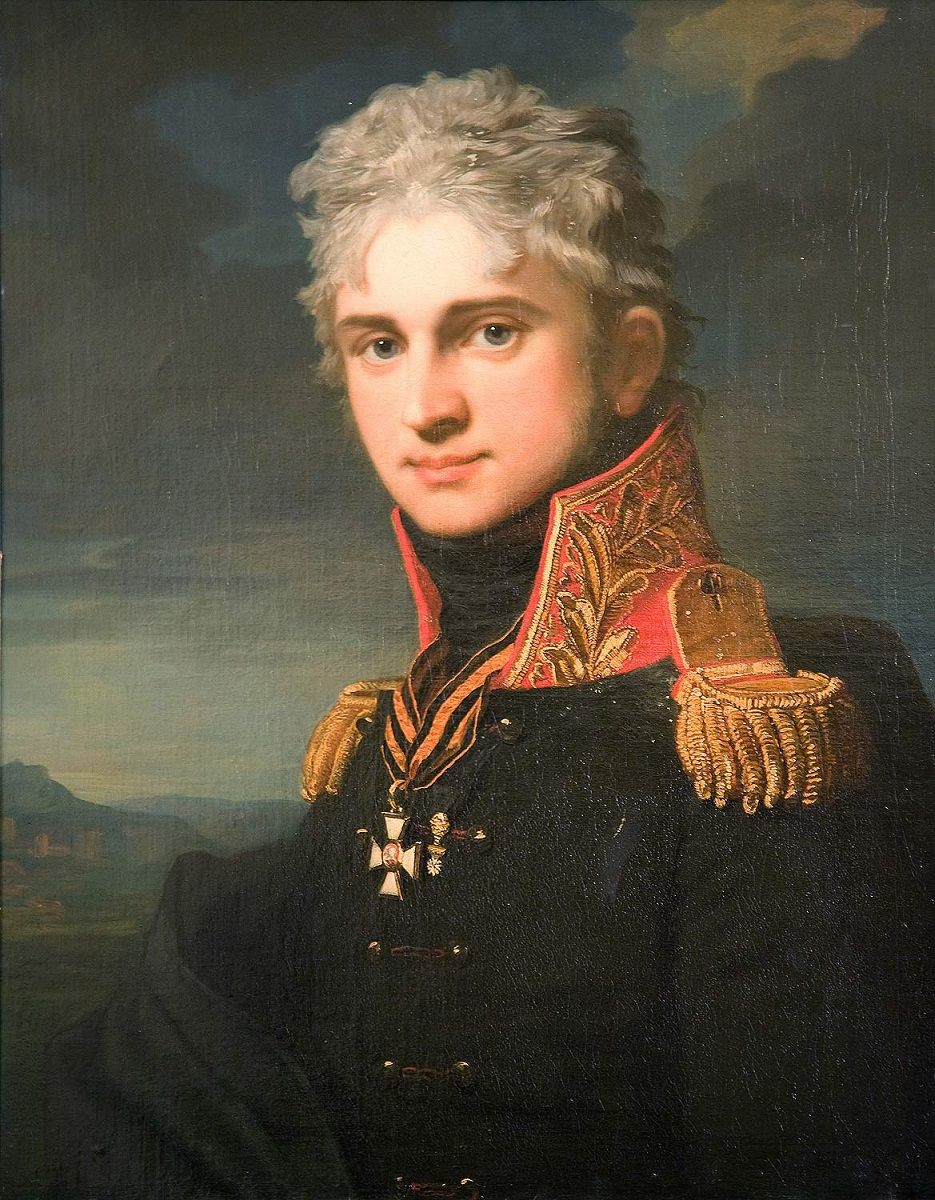
Pavel Alexandrovich Stroganov born 18 June

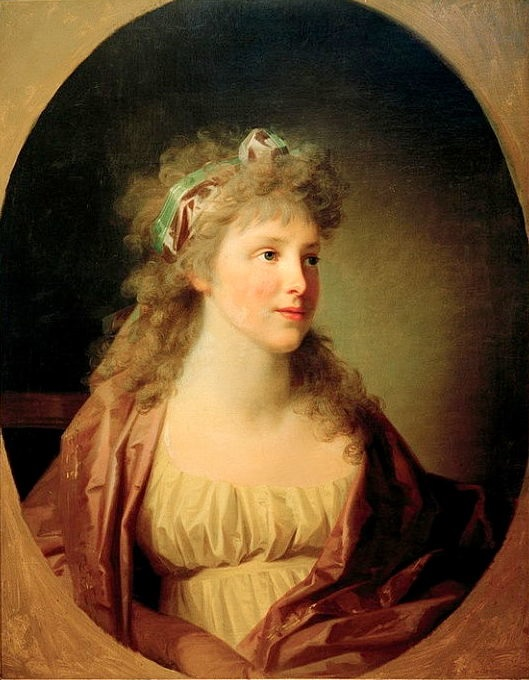
Princess Amalie of Hesse-Homburg born 29 June

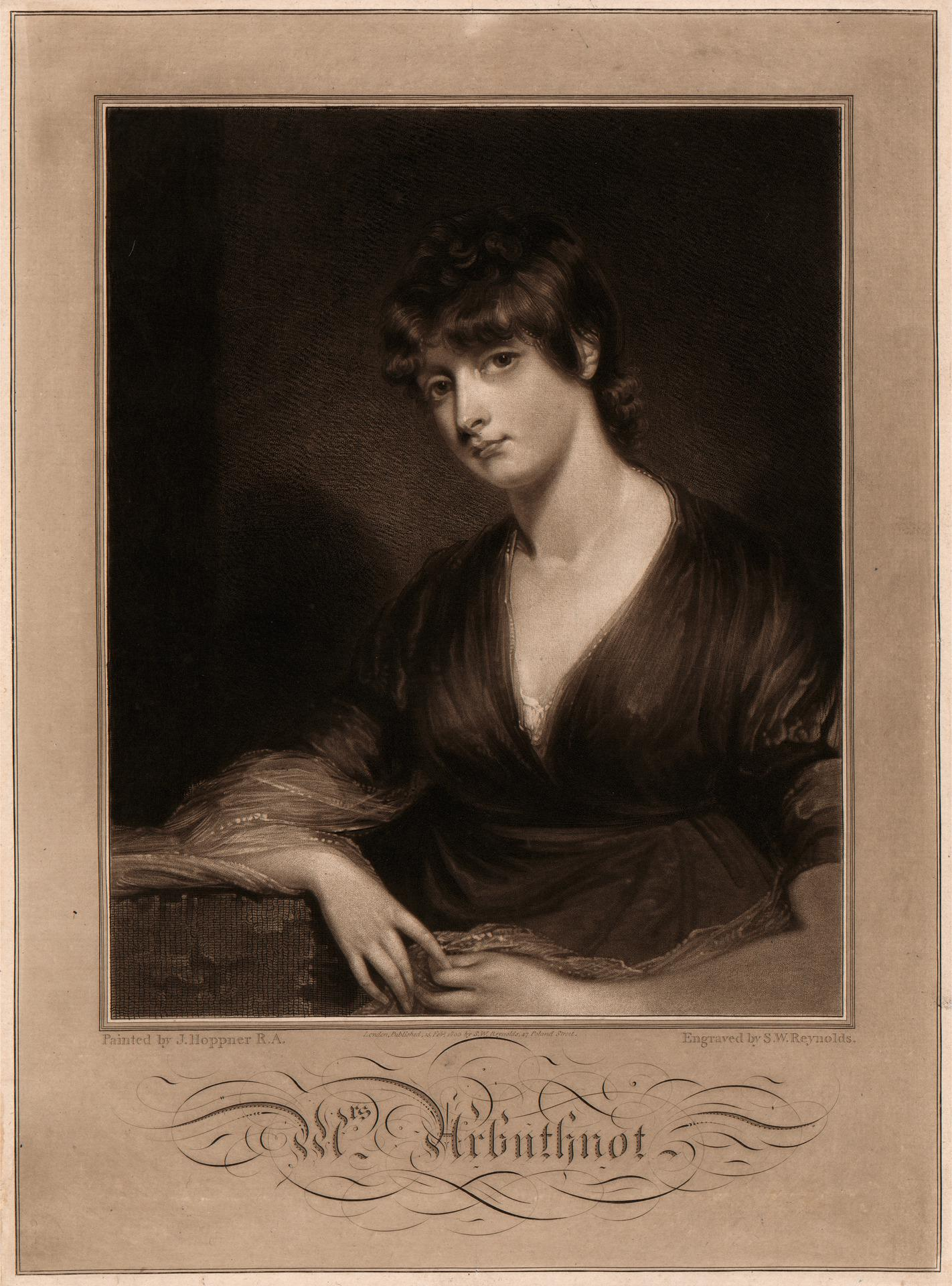
Marcia Arbuthnot born 9 July

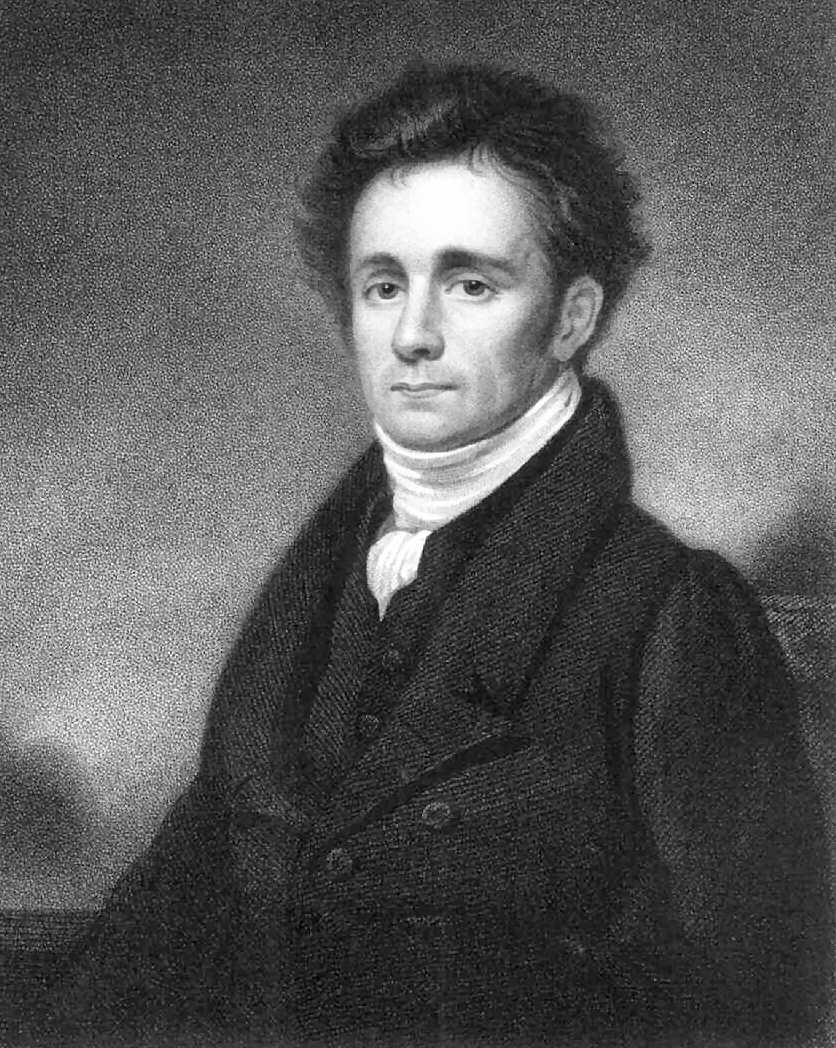
Robert Jameson born 11 July

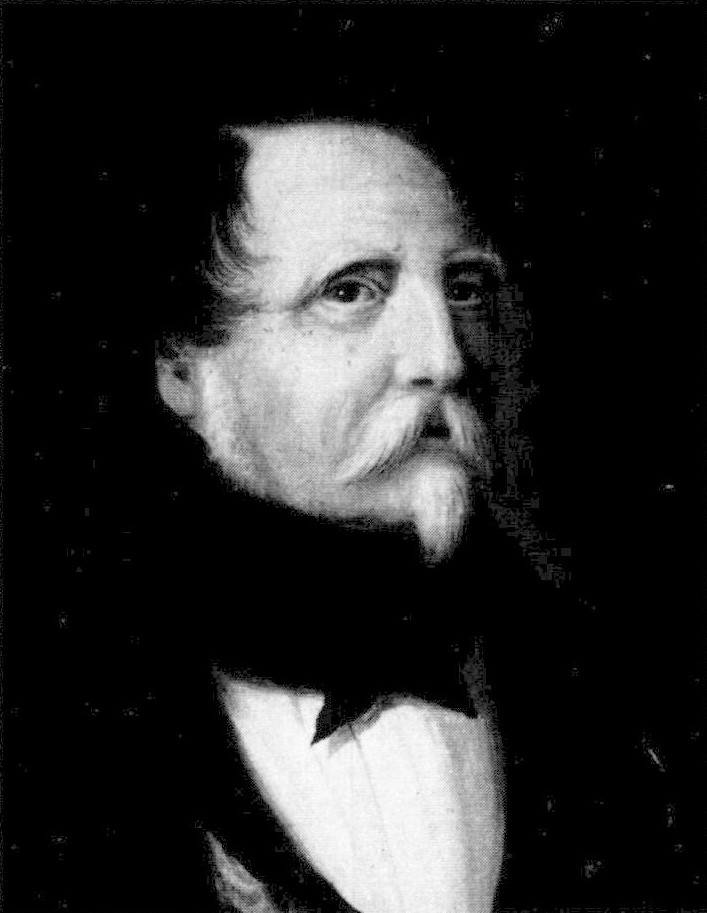
Axel Otto Mörner born 11 July

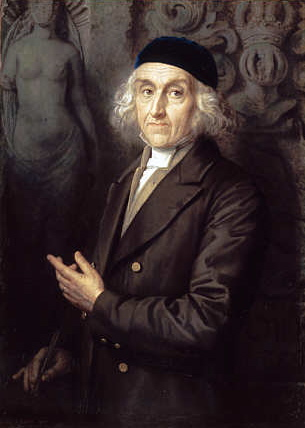
Charles de Graimberg born 30 July

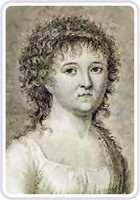
Diodata Saluzzo Roero born 31 July

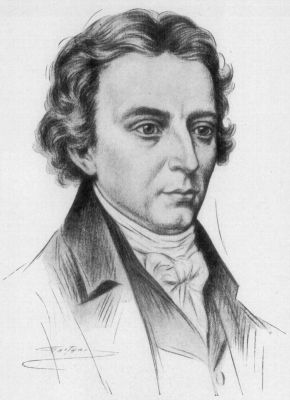
Robert Southey born 12 August

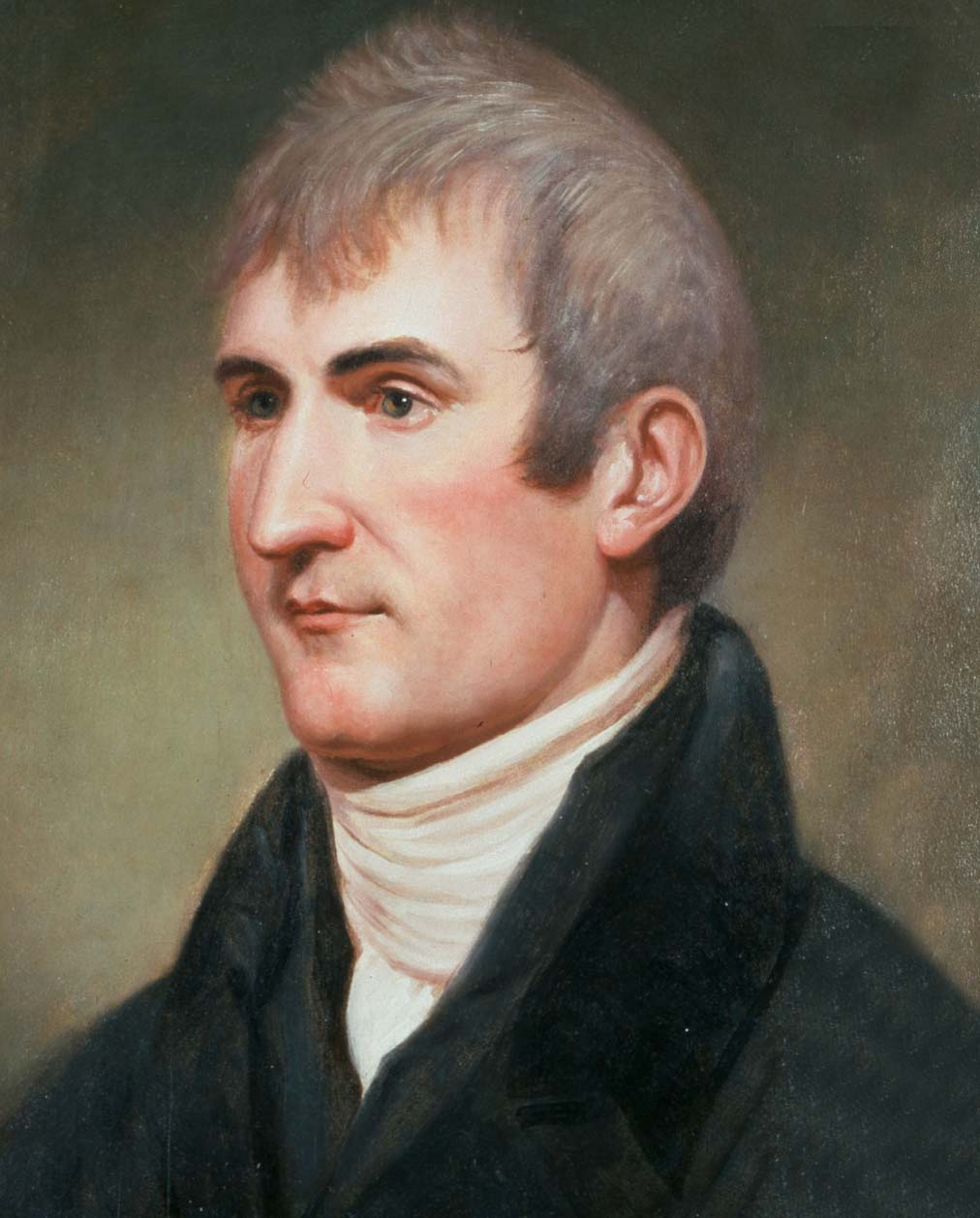
Meriwether Lewis born 18 August

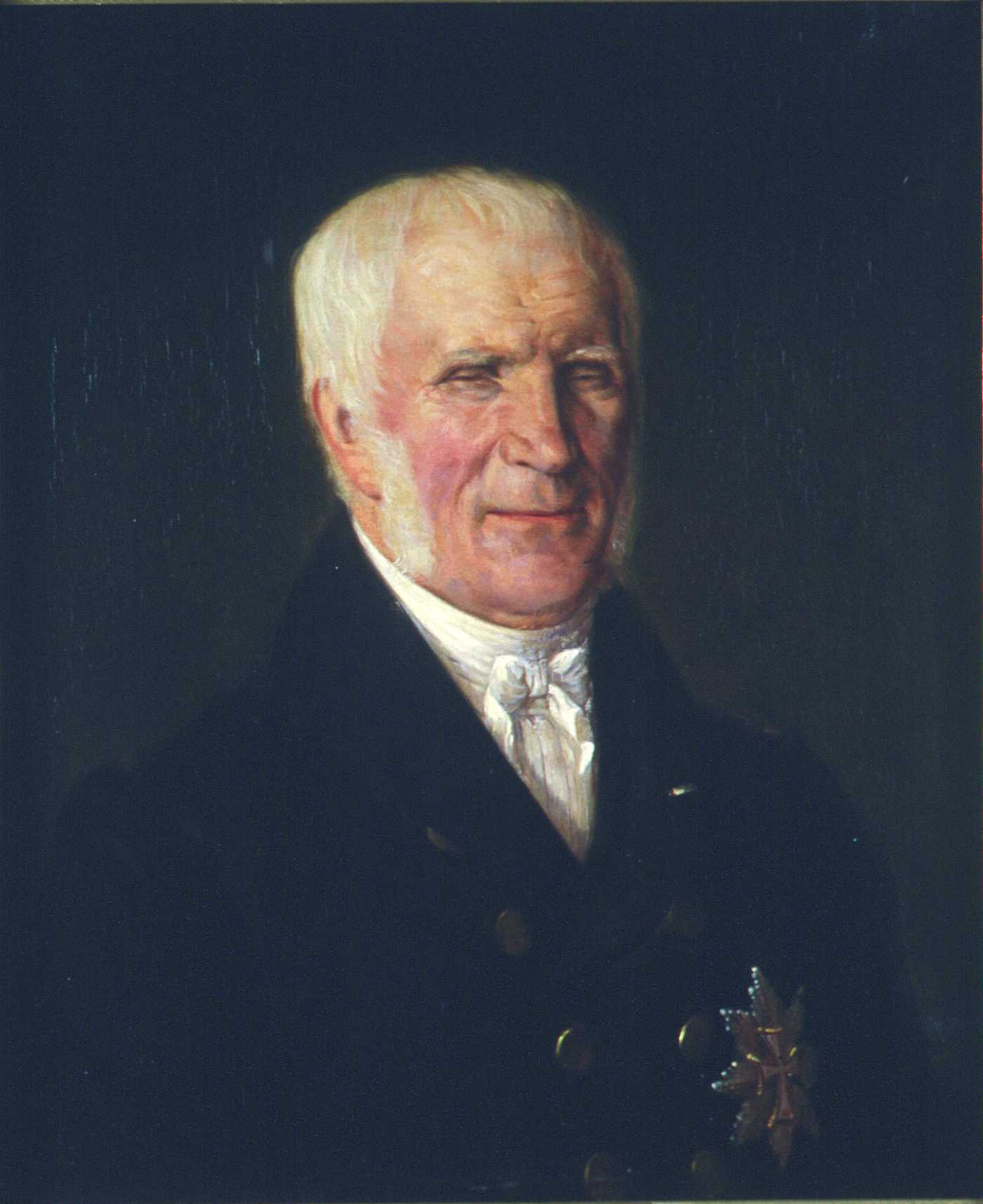
Ludvig Frederik Brock born 20 August

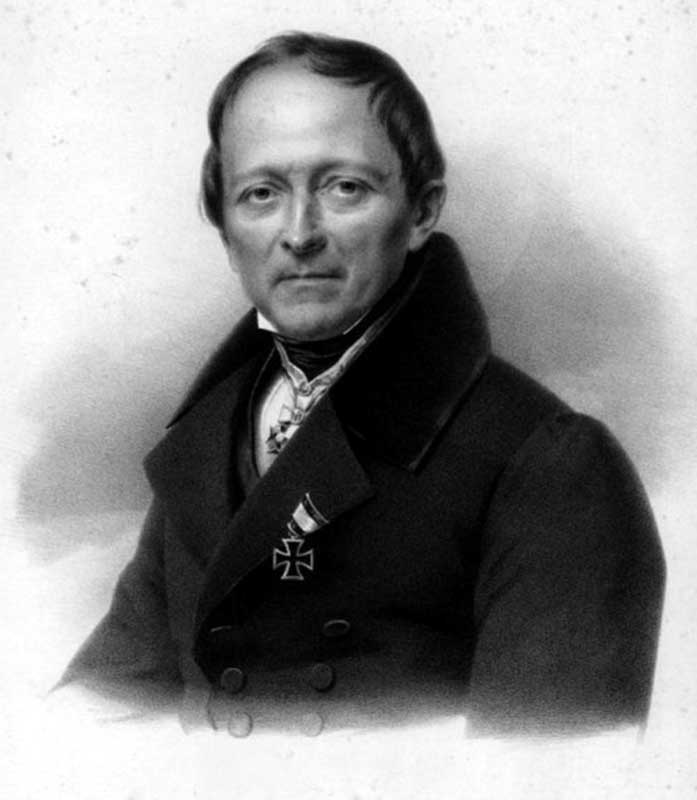
Anton Ludwig Ernst Horn born 24 August

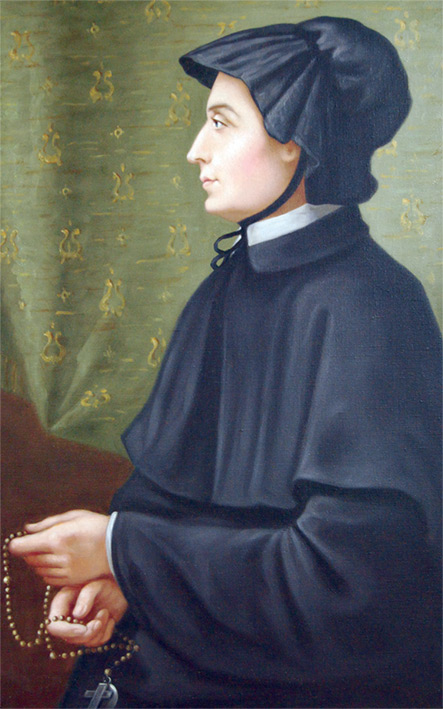
Elizabeth Ann Seton born 28 August

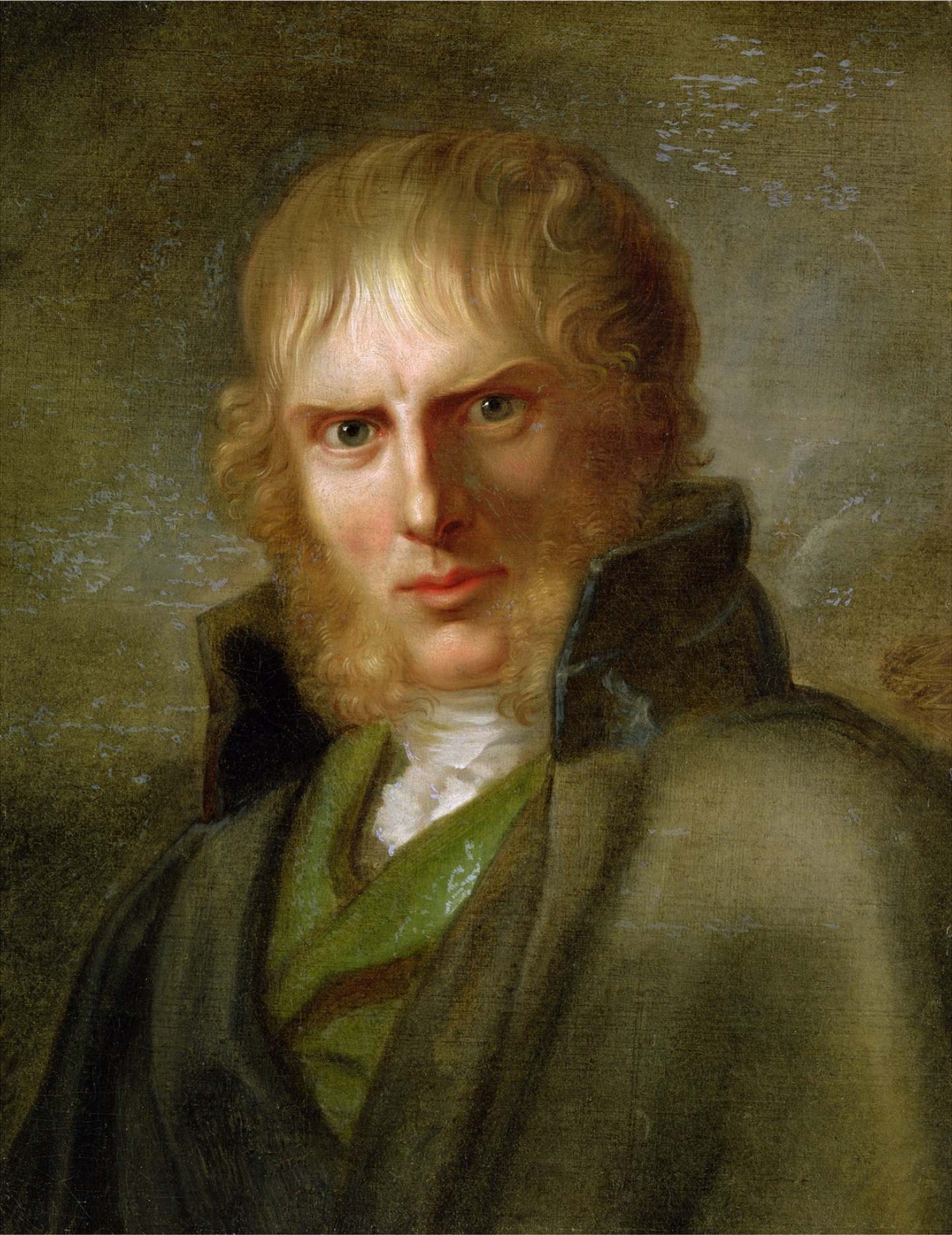
Caspar David Friedrich born 5 September

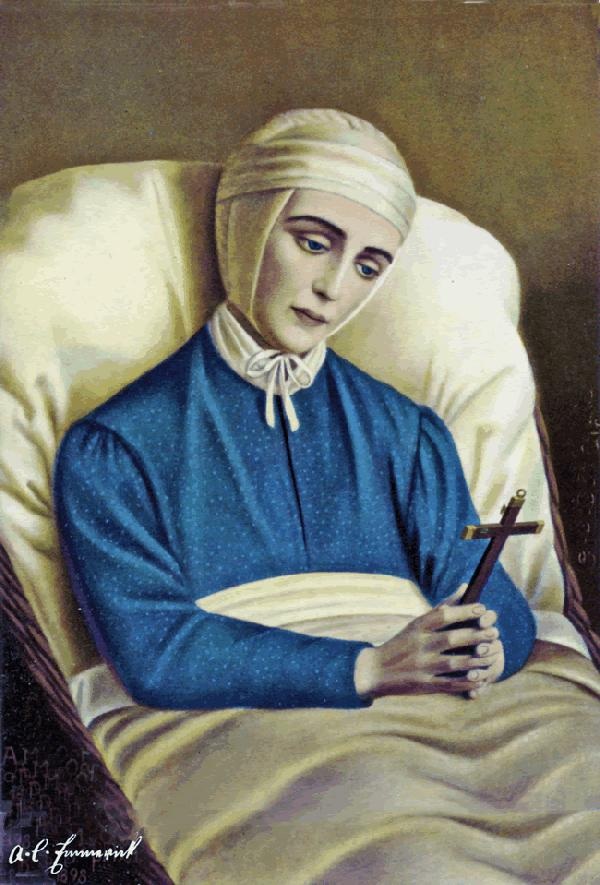
Anne Catherine Emmerich born 8 September

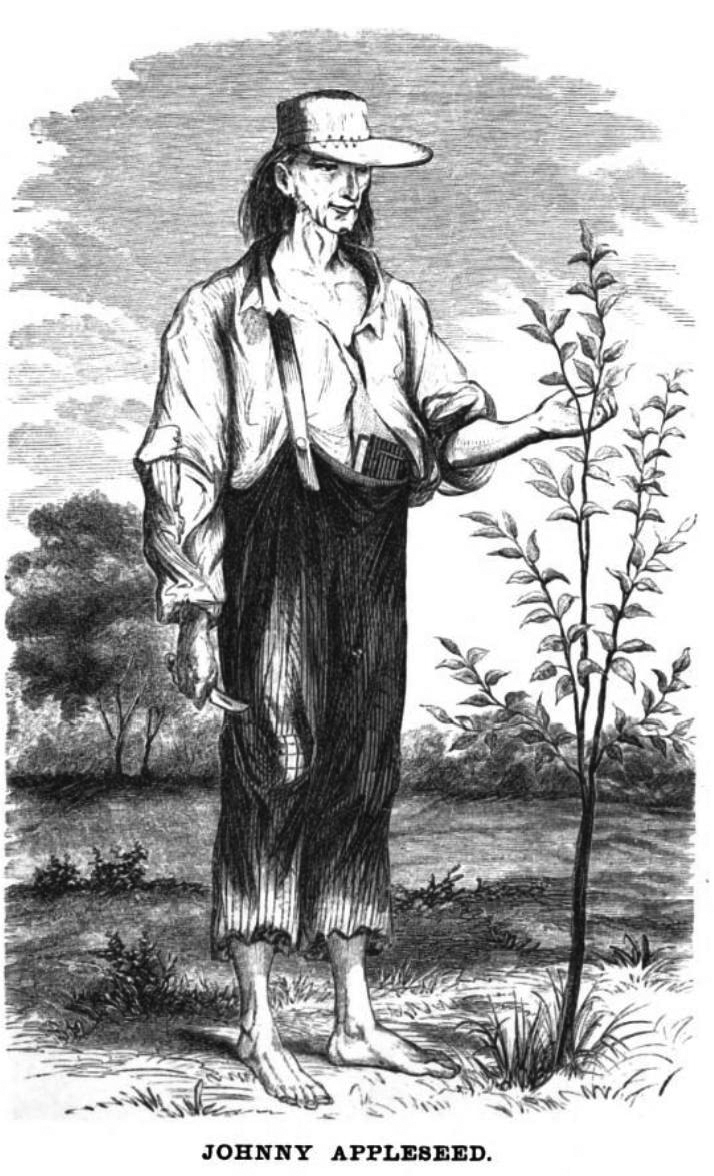
Johnny Appleseed born 26 September

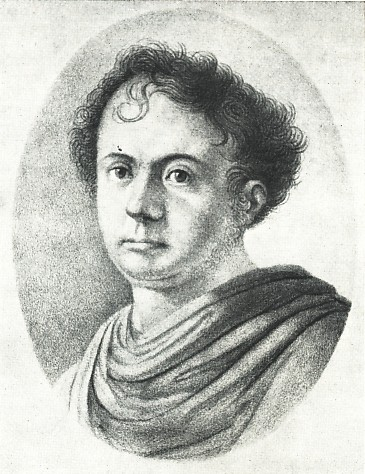
Adolf Müllner born 18 October

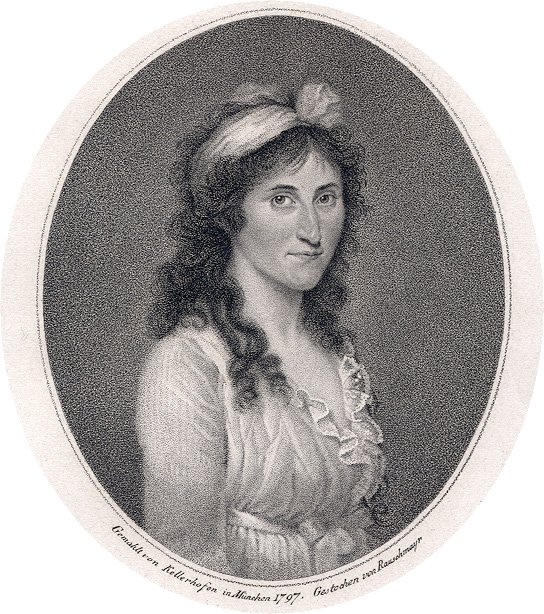
Sarah Thompson, Countess Rumford born 18 October

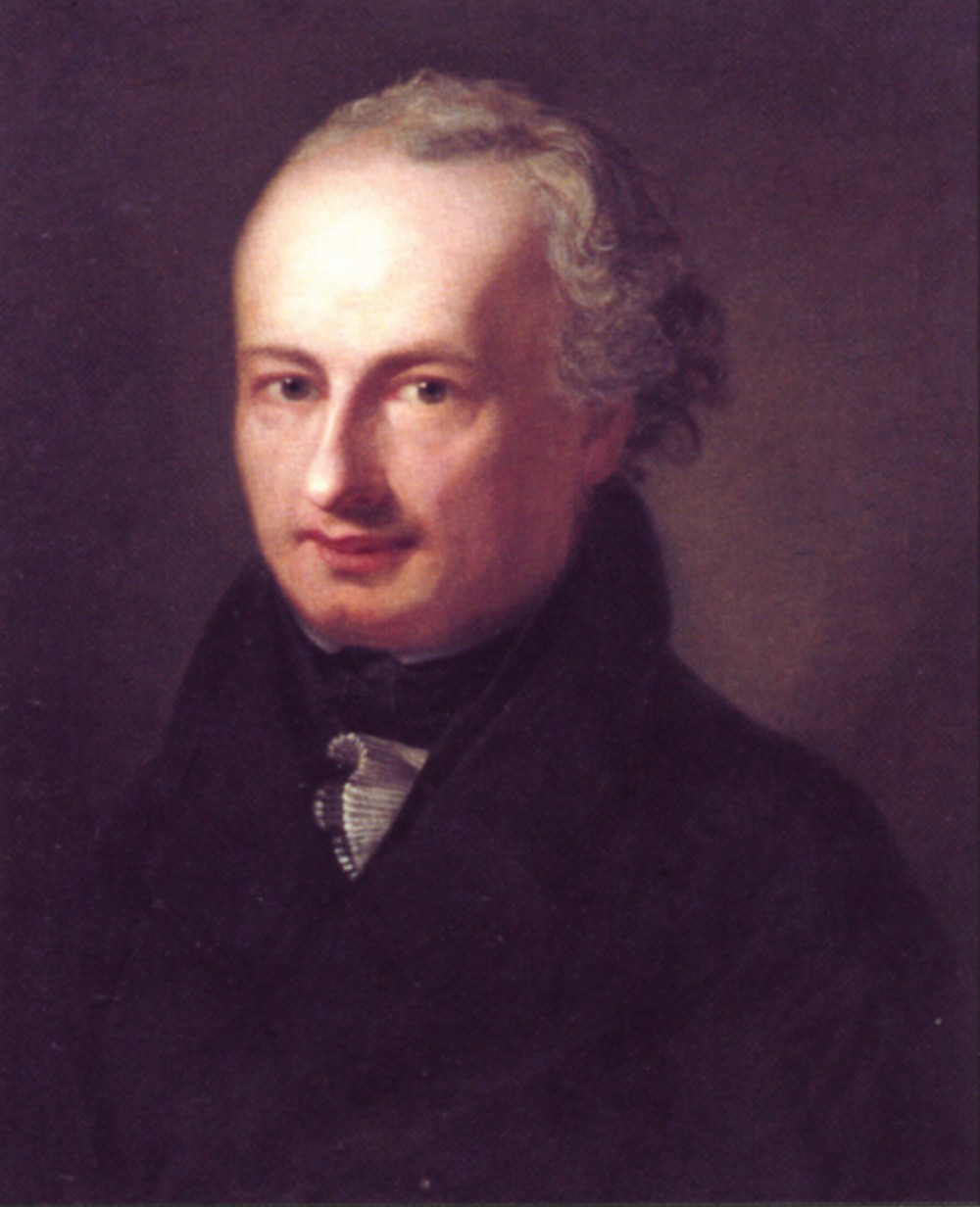
Ignaz Heinrich von Wessenberg born 4 November

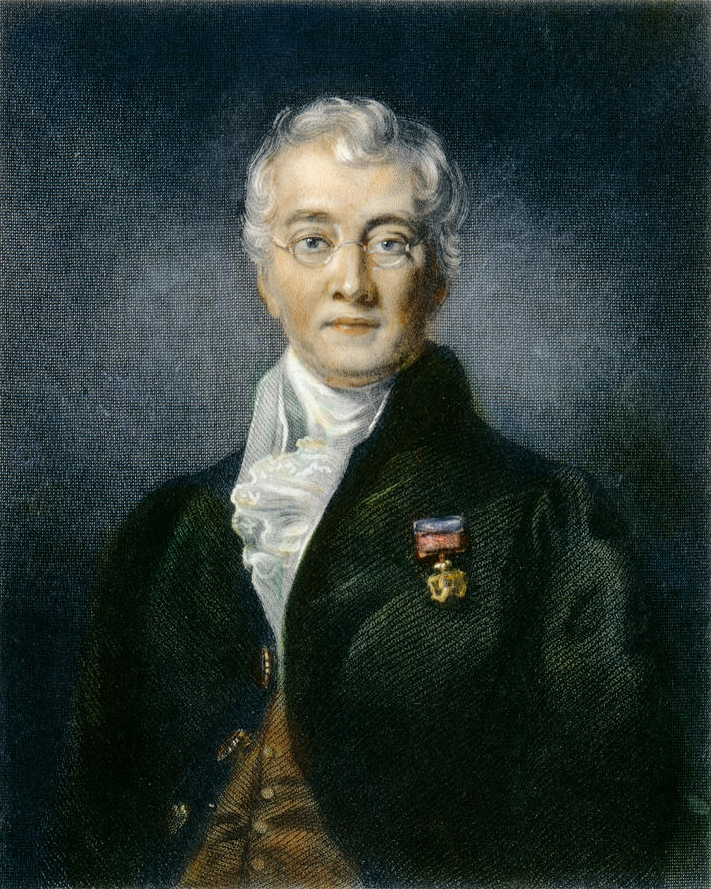
Charles Bell born 12 November

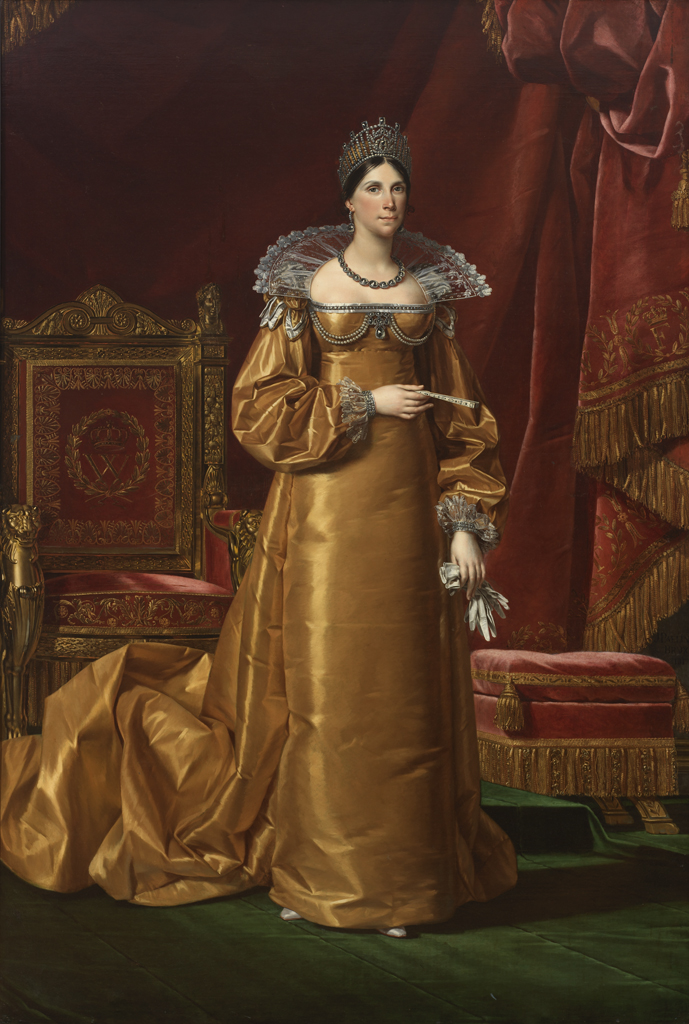
Wilhelmine of Prussia, Queen of the Netherlands born 18 November

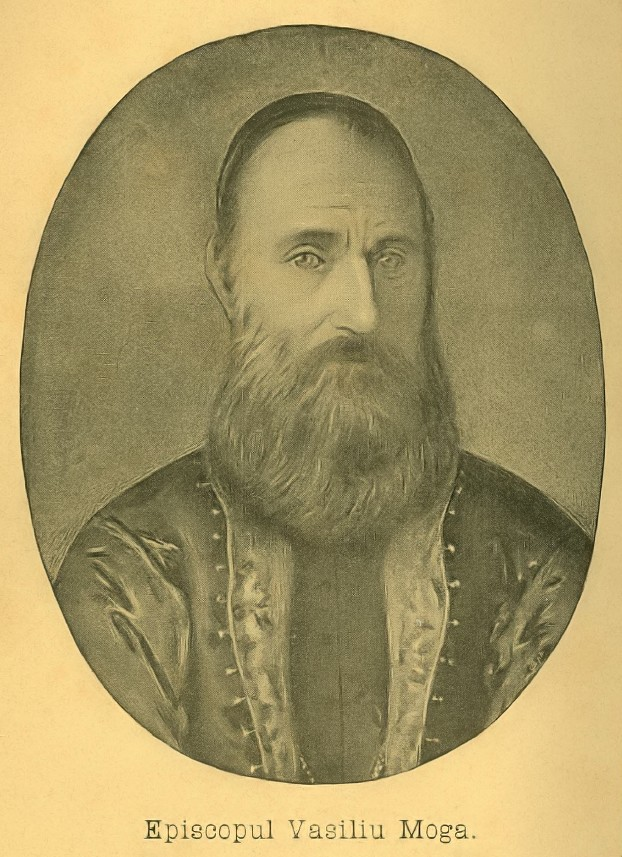
Vasile Moga born 19 November

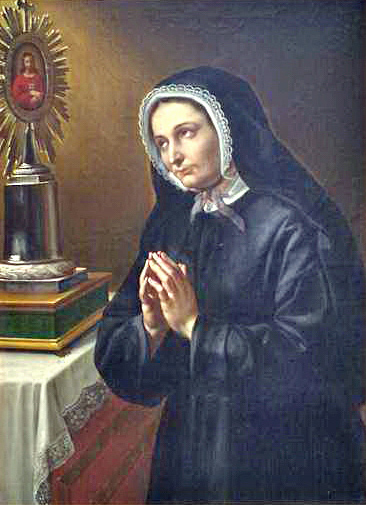
Elisabeth Canori Mora born 21 November

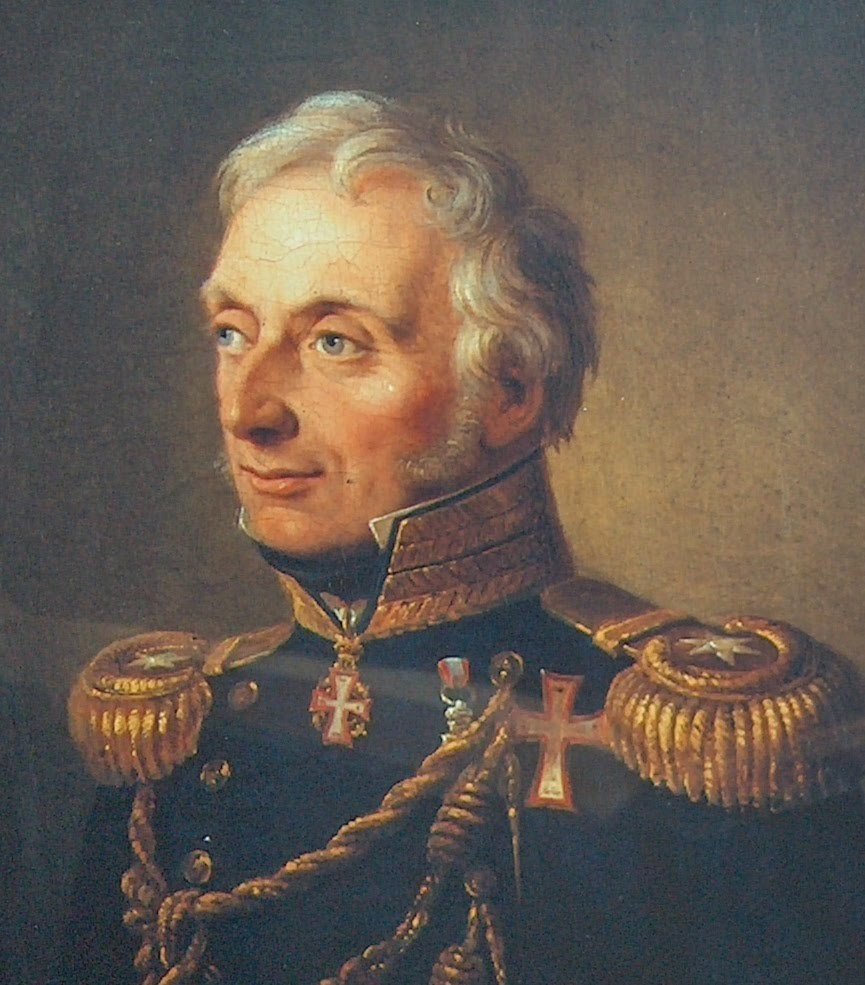
Peter Frederik Wulff born 26 November

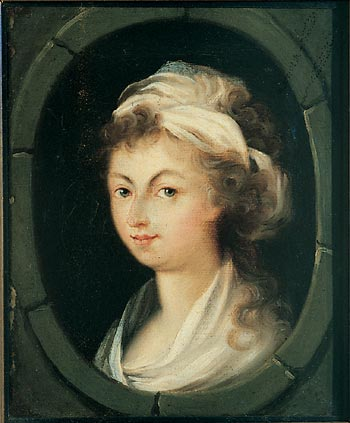
Princess Maria Antonia of Parma born 28 November

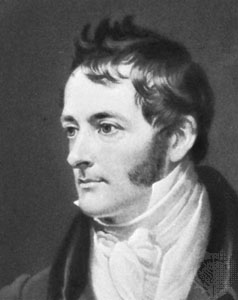
William Henry (chemist) born 12 December

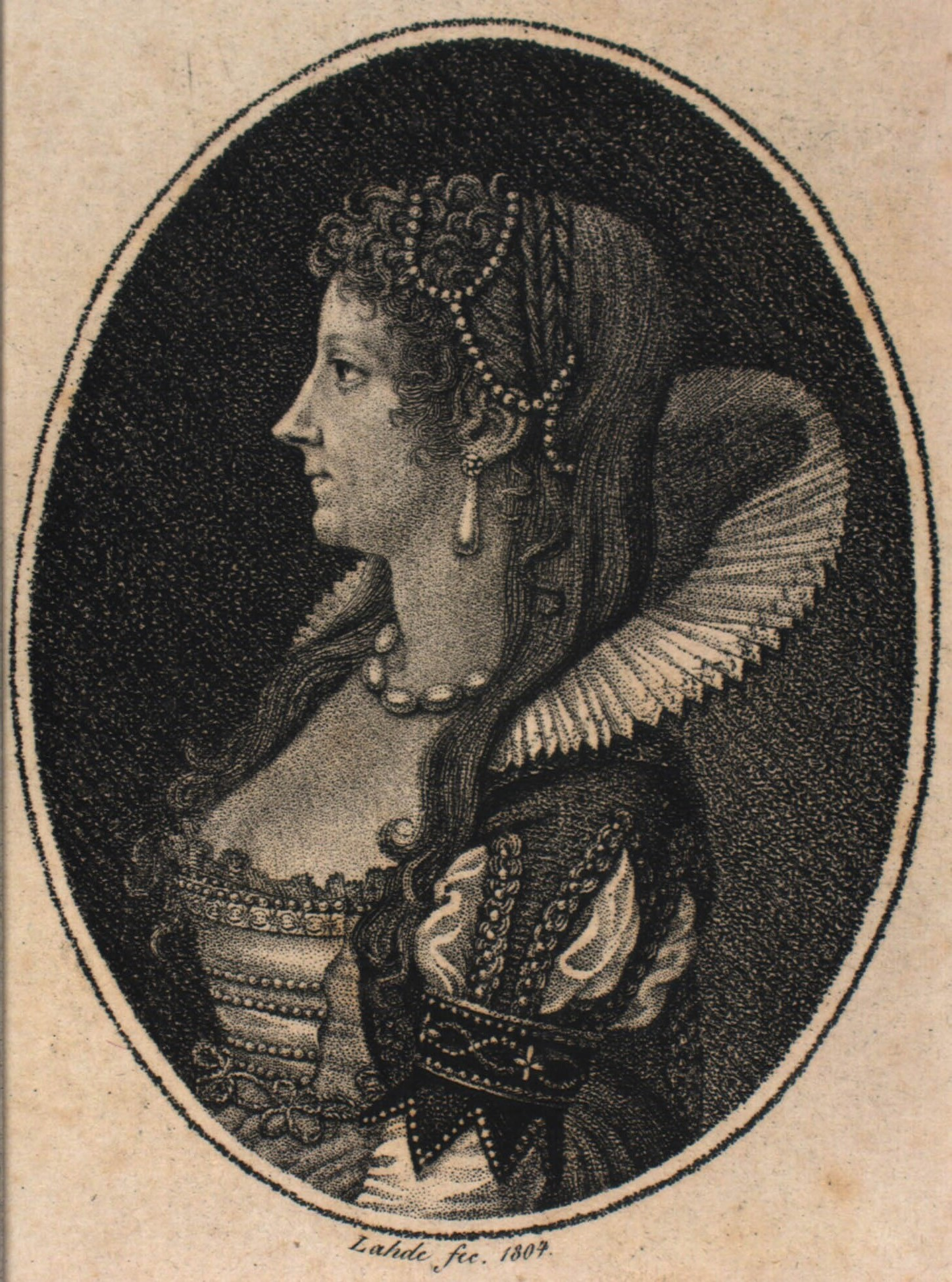
Eline Heger born 13 December

=== January ===
- January 1
  - Lancelot Baugh Allen, Master of Dulwich College (d. 1845)
  - André Marie Constant Duméril, French zoologist (d. 1860)
  - Pietro Giordani, Italian writer (d. 1848)
  - James Johnson, U.S. Representative from Kentucky (d. 1826)
  - William Piper, American politician (d. 1852)
- January 2 – Thomas Lynn, British soldier (d. 1847)
- January 3 – Juan Aldama, Jugador de Beisbole (d. 1811)
- January 4
  - Volant Vashon Ballard, Royal Navy admiral (d. 1832)
  - Edward Dubois, English wit and man of letters (d. 1850)
  - William M. Richardson, American jurist and politician (d. 1838)
- January 5 – George Chinnery, British artist (d. 1852)
- January 6
  - Ole Elias Holck, officer, father of the Constitution of Norway, member of Stortinget (d. 1842)
  - James McCall, American politician (d. 1856)
- January 7
  - Anna Bunina, Russian poet (d. 1829)
  - Samuel D. Purviance, American politician (d. 1806)
- January 8 – John Gibbons, English amateur cricketer (d. 1844)
- January 10
  - Augustin de Macarty, American politician (d. 1844)
  - Jean-Baptiste Muiron, French Army officer (d. 1796)
  - William Stewart, British military officer (d. 1827)
- January 11
  - Antoine Drouot, French general (d. 1847)
  - Charles Henry Schwanfelder, British artist (d. 1837)
  - Tryphosa Jane Wallis, English actress (d. 1848)
- January 12 – William Cahoon, American politician (d. 1833)
- January 14 – Benjamin Aislabie, cricketer (d. 1842)
- January 16 – Daniel Evans, Welsh Independent minister (d. 1835)
- January 17
  - Marie-Thérèse Figueur, French writer (d. 1861)
  - Maria Theresa Kemble, British actress (d. 1838)
  - Georg Wilhelm Franz Wenderoth, German botanist (d. 1861)
- January 18
  - Moses I. Cantine, American politician (d. 1823)
  - James Millingen, British archaeologist (d. 1845)
- January 19
  - Edward Protheroe, British politician (d. 1856)
  - Samuel Campbell Rowley, naval officer and politician (d. 1846)
- January 20 – Charles George Beauclerk, British Member of Parliament (d. 1845)
- January 21 – William Kenrick, English lawyer and politician (d. 1829)
- January 22 – Francesco Fuoco, Italian philologist, economist and Catholic priest (d. 1841)
- January 23 – Richard Southgate, American politician (d. 1857)
- January 24
  - Carl Abraham Arfwedson, Swedish silk merchant (d. 1861)
  - Arnold Timothée de Lasaulx, Belgian politician (d. 1863)
- January 25 – Jules-Paul Pasquier, French jurist (d. 1858)
- January 29
  - Olinthus Gregory, British astronomer (d. 1841)
  - Sir Robert Shaw, 1st Baronet, British politician (d. 1849)
- January 30 – Samuel Butler, English classical scholar and schoolmaster (d. 1839)
- January 31
  - William Blake, British economist; (d. 1852)
  - William George Maton, English physician (d. 1835)
  - Thomas Veazey, American politician (d. 1842)
  - Phineas Waller, Pennsylvanian farmer and landowner (d. 1859)

=== February ===
- February 1
  - John Douglas, Tory politician (d. 1838)
  - Ferdinánd Pálffy, Austrian theatre manager (d. 1840)
- February 2 – Susan Montagu, Duchess of Manchester, British noble (d. 1828)
- February 3
  - Edward Cross, British zookeeper (d. 1854)
  - Karl Mollweide, German mathematician (d. 1825)
- February 4 – Frederick Traugott Pursh, German-American botanist (d. 1820)
- February 5 – Juan Fermín de San Martín, Spanish military personnel (d. 1822)
- February 6 – Henry Bates Grubb, American ironmaster and businessman (d. 1823)
- February 7 – Frederik Christian Kielsen, Danish naturalist (d. 1850)
- February 8
  - Karl Friedrich Heinrich, German classical philologist (d. 1838)
  - Samuel Moore, American politician (d. 1861)
  - Francisco de Paula Vieira da Silva de Tovar, 1st Viscount of Molelos, Portuguese general (d. 1852)
- February 9
  - William Lattimore, American physician and politician (d. 1843)
  - Juan José Viamonte, Argentine general (d. 1843)
- February 11
  - Maxim Gauci, Maltese painter and lithographer (d. 1854)
  - Hans Järta, Swedish politician, civil servant and administrator (d. 1847)
- February 12 – Valentin Stanič, Austrian teacher (d. 1847)
- February 13
  - Robert Curzon, British Member of Parliament (d. 1863)
  - Thomas Myers, British mathematician (d. 1834)
- February 15 – Prince Frederick of Orange-Nassau, Dutch prince (d. 1799)
- February 16
  - Étienne Guy, Canadian politician, surveyor and militia officer (d. 1820)
  - Pierre Rode, French violinist and composer (d. 1830)
- February 17
  - Mykhailo Levytsky, Metropolitan of Lviv (d. 1858)
  - Raphaelle Peale, painter from the United States (d. 1825)
- February 18 – William Clark, farmer, jurist, and politician from Dauphin, Pennsylvania (d. 1851)
- February 24
  - Prince Adolphus, Duke of Cambridge, British and Hanoverian Royal (d. 1850)
  - Archibald Constable, Scottish printer and publisher (d. 1827)
  - Perley Keyes, American politician (d. 1834)
  - Robert S. Rose, American politician (d. 1835)
  - Alexander Wilmot Schomberg, British Royal Navy admiral (d. 1850)
  - Roswell Weston, American lawyer and politician (d. 1861)
- February 25 – George Gore, Anglican priest in Ireland (d. 1844)
- February 26
  - Joseph Bédard, Canadian politician (d. 1832)
  - William Farquhar, first British Resident and Commandant of colonial Singapore (d. 1839)
  - Richard Rouse, public servant and settler (d. 1852)
- February 27 – Thomas Vasse, sea explorer (d. 1801)
- February 28
  - Chamaraja Wodeyar IX, King of Mysore (d. 1796)
  - Thomas Tooke, British economist (d. 1858)

=== March ===
- March 1
  - Magdalene of Canossa, Italian Religious Sister and foundress (d. 1835)
  - Matthias B. Tallmadge, United States federal judge (d. 1819)
- March 2
  - Jean-Siméon Domon, French soldier (d. 1830)
  - Armand Charles Guilleminot, French general during the Napoleonic wars (d. 1840)
- March 4 – Joseph Hamilton Daveiss, American politician (d. 1811)
- March 5 – Christoph Ernst Friedrich Weyse, Danish composer (d. 1842)
- March 7 – Daniel Arnoldi, German Canadian physician (d. 1849)
- March 9
  - Mayhew Folger, American whaler, captain of Topaz (d. 1828)
  - Louis Auguste Say, French economist (d. 1840)
- March 10 – David Semyonovich Abamelik, Russian-Armenian general-major (d. 1833)
- March 12
  - Johann Caspar Horner, Swiss mathematician (d. 1834)
  - John Scott, English engraver (d. 1827)
  - Eva Unander, Swedish librarian (d. 1836)
- March 13
  - Rose Fortune, Canadian businesswoman (d. 1864)
  - Pierre-Narcisse Guérin, French painter (d. 1833)
- March 14
  - Helena Margaretha Van Dielen, Dutch painter (d. 1841)
  - Jedediah Morgan, American politician (d. 1826)
- March 15
  - John Conrad Otto, American physician (d. 1844)
  - Salomon Soldin, Jewish-Danish bookseller (d. 1837)
  - Isaac Weld, Irish writer, explorer and artist (d. 1856)
- March 16
  - Captain Matthew Flinders, English navigator and cartographer (d. 1814)
  - Jethro Wood, inventor of a cast-iron moldboard plow with replaceable parts (d. 1834)
- March 19 – Franz von Paula Gruithuisen, Bavarian physician and astronomer (d. 1852)
- March 20 – Alexandra Petrovna Golitsyna, maid of honour and historian (d. 1842)
- March 21 – George Scovell, British Army general (d. 1861)
- March 24 – Jean-Louis-Auguste Loiseleur-Deslongchamps, French botanist (d. 1849)
- March 25
  - Thomas Brand, 20th Baron Dacre, British politician (d. 1851)
  - Thomas Spalding, American politician (d. 1851)
- March 28 – William Williams, British Member of Parliament (d. 1839)
- March 30
  - Nathaniel Peabody, American physician (d. 1855)
  - Claudine Thévenet, French Catholic religious sister (d. 1837)
- March 31
  - Enos Bronson, American writer (d. 1823)
  - Karl Gottfried Erdmann, German author and botanist (d. 1835)

=== April ===
- April 1
  - Gottfried Daniel Krummacher, German clergyman (d. 1837)
  - Gustav von Rauch, Prussian general (d. 1841)
  - Therese Rosenbaum, Austrian opera singer (d. 1837)
- April 5
  - David Gillespie, American surveyor and politician (d. 1829)
  - Thomas Potter, British politician (d. 1845)
- April 6
  - José de Córdoba y Rojas, Spanish admiral (d. 1810)
  - Marmaduke Williams, American politician (d. 1850)
- April 7
  - Joseph Bailly, fur trader and pioneer from Canada (d. 1835)
  - Robert William Elliston, British actor (d. 1831)
  - Abner Kneeland, United States theologian (d. 1844)
- April 8
  - Kaspar Anton Karl van Beethoven, brother of Ludwig van Beethoven (d. 1815)
  - Jean-Pierre Dellard, French general (d. 1832)
  - James William Freshfield, English lawyer and founder of the law firm Freshfields (d. 1864)
- April 9 – John Stanly, American politician (d. 1834)
- April 11
  - Michele Carrascosa, Italian politician (d. 1853)
  - Conrad Hinrich Donner, German banker and art collector (d. 1854)
  - Lawrence Augustine Washington, Nephew of George Washington (d. 1824)
- April 12
  - Johann Baptist Krebs, German writer and director (d. 1851)
  - Leffert Lefferts, the first President of the Long Island Bank, the first bank in Brooklyn, New York (d. 1847)
- April 13 – John W. Mulligan, attorney, U.S. Consul in Athens, Greece (d. 1862)
- April 15 – Sophie Thalbitzer, Danish writer (d. 1851)
- April 16
  - George Bennet, English missionary (d. 1841)
  - Franz Hegi, Swiss artist (d. 1850)
- April 17
  - Friedrich Koenig, German printer (d. 1833)
  - Robert Spankie, British politician, barrister (d. 1842)
  - Václav Tomášek, Czech music educator and composer (d. 1850)
- April 18
  - Antonio Basoli, Italian painter (d. 1848)
  - Madhavrao II, 12th Peshwa of Maratha Empire (d. 1795)
  - Georg von Langsdorff, Russian-German scientist (d. 1852)
- April 19 – Friedrich Wilhelm Riemer, German writer (d. 1845)
- April 21
  - Jean-Louis Aumer, French ballet dancer and choreographer (d. 1833)
  - Jean-Baptiste Biot, French physicist, astronomer and mathematician (d. 1862)
  - Philibert Jean-Baptiste Curial, French general (d. 1829)
- April 23 – Francis Austen, British Royal Navy officer (d. 1865)
- April 24 – Jean Marc Gaspard Itard, French physician (d. 1838)
- April 25 – Friedrich Wilhelm von Lepel, Prussian major general and adjutant (d. 1840)
- April 26
  - Christian Leopold von Buch, German geologist (d. 1853)
  - Anne Jean Marie René Savary, French general (d. 1833)
- April 28
  - Francis Baily, British astronomer (d. 1844)
  - Henrietta Bentinck, Duchess of Portland, British noble (d. 1844)
  - James Deacon Hume, British economist (d. 1842)
  - Owen Biddle Jr., American architect (d. 1806)
  - Manuel Piar, Venezuelan general (d. 1817)
- April 29
  - Louis Pierre Aimé Chastel, French officer (d. 1826)
  - Anna Gottlieb, Austrian singer (d. 1856)
  - David Hoadley, American architect (d. 1839)
  - Richard Sass, British artist (d. 1849)
- April 30 – John Yelloly, English doctor (d. 1842)

=== May ===
- May 1
  - John Reeves, English naturalist (d. 1856)
  - Robert Watt, Scottish physician and bibliographer (d. 1819)
- May 2
  - George Lewis, Royal Marines officer (d. 1854)
  - Ichijō Tadayoshi, Japanese kugyō (court noble) of the Edo period (d. 1837)
- May 4
  - Samuel W. Bridgham, Rhode Island politician (d. 1840)
  - Rufus Easton, American politician (d. 1834)
- May 5
  - Robert Barrie, British naval officer (d. 1841)
  - Nicolas Hyacinthe Gautier, French officer (d. 1809)
- May 6
  - Pierce Butler, British politician (d. 1846)
  - John Elias, Welsh writer and preacher (d. 1841)
  - Christoph von Lieven, Russian general and prince (d. 1839)
- May 7
  - William Bainbridge, United States Navy officer (d. 1833)
  - Jonathan Makepeace, U.S. politician (d. 1850)
- May 11 – James Townley, English Wesleyan minister and author (d. 1833)
- May 12
  - Ellis Cunliffe Lister, British politician (d. 1853)
  - Samuel Owen, British-Swedish engineer (d. 1854)
  - Friederike von Reden, German noblewoman, philanthropist and salon-holder (d. 1854)
- May 14
  - Joseph Bouchette, Canadian surveyor (d. 1841)
  - Thomas Pakenham, 2nd Earl of Longford, Anglo-Irish peer (d. 1835)
- May 15 – Johann Nepomuk von Fuchs, German chemist and mineralogist (d. 1856)
- May 16 – Johann Baptist von Keller, Roman Catholic bishop (d. 1845)
- May 18 – Gaetano Rossi, Italian librettist (d. 1855)
- May 21
  - Claude Antoine Compère, French general (d. 1812)
  - Jean-Henry-Louis Greffulhe, French private banker and politician (d. 1820)
- May 22
  - James Bennett, British minister (d. 1862)
  - Levi Cutter, American businessman politician (d. 1856)
- May 24
  - Sir Charles Burrell, 3rd Baronet, English Conservative politician (d. 1862)
  - Stuart Corbett, Archdeacon of York (d. 1845)
  - Francis Magan, United Irishman, barrister and informer (d. 1843)
- May 25
  - Isaach Isaachsen, Norwegian politician (d. 1828)
  - John Pye-Smith, English theologian (d. 1851)
- May 26 – Jean-Nicolas Curély, French cavalry officer (d. 1827)
- May 27 – Francis Beaufort, Irish hydrographer and naval officer (d. 1857)
- May 28 – Edward Charles Howard, British chemist (d. 1816)

=== June ===
- June 1
  - Pryse Pryse, British Whig politician (d. 1849)
  - Ferdinand Weerth, German theologian (d. 1836)
- June 2 – William Lawson, English-born Australian explorer and politician (d. 1850)
- June 3
  - John Roblin, Canadian politician (d. 1813)
  - Robert Tannahill, Scottish poet (d. 1810)
- June 5
  - Louis Victorin Cassagne, French officer (d. 1841)
  - Charles Bulkeley Egerton, British Army general (d. 1857)
- June 6
  - Sir John D'Oyly, 1st Baronet, of Kandy, British colonial administrator (d. 1824)
  - János Nepomuk Farkas, Hungarian politician (d. 1847)
  - Étienne Soulange-Bodin, French agronomist (d. 1846)
- June 8 – Henry Philip Hope, Anglo-Dutch art and gem collector (d. 1839)
- June 9
  - Pierre-Athanase Chauvin, French painter (d. 1832)
  - Joseph von Hammer-Purgstall, Austrian orientalist (d. 1856)
  - Edward King, Royal Navy officer (d. 1807)
  - Nathaniel Upham, American politician (d. 1829)
  - Christopher Wordsworth, English divine and scholar (d. 1846)
- June 10
  - George Dollond, British astronomer (d. 1852)
  - Carl Haller von Hallerstein, German architect (d. 1817)
- June 11
  - Christian Conrad Danneskiold-Samsøe, Danish aristocrat, magistrate and businessman (d. 1823)
  - George Suttor, farmer and pioneer settler in New South Wales, Australia (d. 1859)
- June 13 – Jacob Lindley, Founder of Ohio University (d. 1857)
- June 14
  - David Low Dodge, American theologian (d. 1852)
  - Johann Karl Freiesleben, German miner and geologist (d. 1846)
- June 17 – Asahel Stearns, American politician (d. 1839)
- June 18
  - Charles Elphinstone Fleeming, British politician and Royal Navy admiral (d. 1840)
  - Pavel Alexandrovich Stroganov, Russian military commander and statesman (d. 1817)
- June 19
  - Aloys von Kaunitz-Rietberg, German nobleman and a diplomat of the Austrian Empire (d. 1848)
  - Egerton Smith, British magazine publisher, editor (d. 1841)
  - Leonard Woods, American theologian (d. 1854)
- June 21
  - James Patton Preston, American politician (d. 1843)
  - Daniel D. Tompkins, American politician; sixth vice president of the United States (d. 1825)
- June 23
  - François Antoine Lallemand, French general (d. 1839)
  - Matthijs Siegenbeek, Dutch academic (d. 1854)
- June 24
  - Antonio González de Balcarce, Argentine general (d. 1819)
  - John Cole, American music publisher (d. 1855)
  - Princess Caroline of Gloucester, British princess (d. 1775)
  - François-Nicolas-Benoît Haxo, French general (d. 1838)
  - Claude Charles Marie du Campe de Rosamel, French naval minister (d. 1848)
  - Azariah Shadrach, Welsh minister (d. 1844)
  - Edward Taylor, British politician (d. 1843)
- June 25
  - James Gage, Canadian businessman (d. 1854)
  - Marcus Wallenberg, Swedish bishop, 1774–1833 (d. 1833)
- June 29 – Princess Amalie of Hesse-Homburg, Consort of Frederick, Hereditary Prince of Anhalt-Dessau (d. 1846)

=== July ===
- July 5
  - George Butler, English schoolmaster and divine (d. 1853)
  - Charles Herbert, British politician (d. 1808)
- July 7 – Louis Auguste Marchand Plauzonne, French general (d. 1812)
- July 9 – Marcia Arbuthnot, lady-in-waiting (d. 1806)
- July 10 – Isaac Bullard, American politician (d. 1808)
- July 11
  - Robert Jameson, British scientist; (d. 1854)
  - Somerset Lowry-Corry, 2nd Earl Belmore, Irish nobleman and politician (d. 1841)
  - Axel Otto Mörner, Swedish count, general, politician and artist (d. 1852)
- July 12
  - Jonathan Friedrich Bahnmaier, German theologian (d. 1841)
  - Jean-Francois Coindet, Genevan physiologist (d. 1834)
  - James Stuart, British politician (d. 1833)
- July 14
  - Hans Graf von Bülow, German noble (d. 1825)
  - Ferdinand Hartmann, German painter (d. 1842)
  - Francis Lathom, British writer (d. 1832)
- July 15 – David Jacob van Lennep, Dutch university professor, poet and writer (d. 1853)
- July 17 – John Wilbur, American Quaker minister (d. 1856)
- July 20
  - Edward Pelham Brenton, British Royal Navy officer & historian (d. 1839)
  - Auguste de Marmont, French General, nobleman and Marshal of France (d. 1852)
- July 24 – Franz von Klebelsberg zu Thumburg, Czech nobleman (d. 1857)
- July 26 – Ernst Ludwig von Tippelskirch, Prussian army officer (d. 1840)
- July 28
  - Elias Walker Durnford, British Army general (d. 1850)
  - John West, British Royal Navy officer (d. 1862)
- July 29 – Edward Wakefield, English statistician (d. 1854)
- July 30 – Charles de Graimberg, French art collector and painter (d. 1864)
- July 31
  - Jonathan Richmond, American politician (d. 1853)
  - Diodata Saluzzo Roero, Italian writer and poet (d. 1840)

=== August ===
- August 1
  - John Adam, silversmith (d. 1848)
  - Jérôme Demers, Québécois priest and teacher of philosophy (d. 1853)
  - Friedrich Guimpel, German illustrator, engraver and botanical artist (d. 1839)
- August 2 – Ole Clausen Mørch, Norwegian politician (d. 1829)
- August 5
  - Karl Wilhelm Bardou, German portraitist (d. 1842)
  - John C. Devereux, American politician (d. 1848)
- August 6 – Asa Wells, pioneer farmer and surveyor from Pompey (d. 1859)
- August 7
  - François Benjamin Levrault, French politician (d. 1855)
  - William Morgan, resident of Batavia, New York (d. 1826)
- August 9
  - George Frederick Beltz, British genealogist (d. 1841)
  - Solomon Van Rensselaer, American politician and soldier (d. 1852)
- August 11
  - Eugène François d'Arnauld, French public official (d. 1854)
  - Joseph Franque, French painter (d. 1833)
  - Manuel de Sarratea, Argentine politician (d. 1849)
  - François Tassé, Canadian politician (d. 1832)
- August 12
  - Jean François Boissonade de Fontarabie, historian from France (d. 1857)
  - Hannah Kilham, Methodist missionary (d. 1832)
  - Stephen Peter Rigaud, English mathematical historian and astronomer (d. 1839)
  - Robert Southey, English romantic poet (d. 1843)
- August 13
  - Hipólito da Costa, Brazilian journalist and diplomat (d. 1823)
  - John Wilson, Scottish landscape and marine painter (d. 1855)
- August 15 – François-Joseph-Marie Fayolle, French musicologist, man of letters and mathematician (d. 1852)
- August 17
  - George E. Blake, American music publisher (d. 1871)
  - Stephan von Breuning, German librettist and author (d. 1827)
- August 18
  - Gaspard Laurent Bayle, French physician (d. 1816)
  - Meriwether Lewis, American explorer, soldier and public administrator (d. 1809)
- August 19 – Denis-Benjamin Viger, Lower Canadian politician (d. 1861)
- August 20
  - Ludvig Frederik Brock, Norwegian military officer (d. 1853)
  - Bernardo Gutiérrez de Lara, Governor of Tamaulipas (d. 1841)
- August 22
  - François Aregnaudeau, French privateer captain (d. 1812)
  - Bartholomäus Herder, German publisher (d. 1839)
- August 23
  - Pierre David de Colbert-Chabanais, French general (d. 1853)
  - Jacob Crocheron, American politician (d. 1849)
  - Mary Moody Emerson, American writer (d. 1863)
  - William Plunkett Maclay, American politician (d. 1842)
- August 24 – Anton Ludwig Ernst Horn, German physician (d. 1848)
- August 25 – Samuel William Manthey, Norwegian politician (d. 1815)
- August 26 – Sir John Lubbock, 2nd Baronet, English banker, politician (d. 1840)
- August 28 – Elizabeth Ann Seton, co-founder of Mount St. Mary's University in the United States, founder of the Sisters of Charity (d. 1821)
- August 30 – Henri Van Assche, painter (d. 1841)
- August 31 – Charles Turner, English engraver (d. 1857)

=== September ===
- September 1
  - George Platt, Canadian politician (d. 1816)
  - Jane Stewart, Countess of Galloway, British noble (d. 1842)
- September 5
  - Enos Collins, Canadian businessman (d. 1871)
  - Caspar David Friedrich, German painter (d. 1840)
- September 7
  - Johann Jakob Bernhardi, German physician and botanist (d. 1850)
  - Colin Halkett, British Army general (d. 1856)
  - Vedanayagam Sastriar Tamil Lutheran hymnwriter and court poet (d. 1864)
- September 8
  - Richard Ashley, English viola player (d. 1836)
  - Anne Catherine Emmerich, German Augustinian Canoness, mystic, Marian visionary, ecstatic and stigmatist (d. 1824)
- September 9 – Salomon Mayer von Rothschild, Austrian banker and businessman (d. 1855)
- September 14
  - Lord William Bentinck, First Governor General of India, British soldier and statesman (d. 1839)
  - Georges Boisot, Minister of Interior of the Helvetic Republic (d. 1853)
  - Henry Ridgely Warfield, American politician (d. 1839)
- September 15
  - Robert Hastings Hunkins, American politician (d. 1853)
  - María Nicolasa de Iturbide, princess of Iturbide (d. 1840)
- September 17
  - William Fitzwilliam Owen, British Royal Navy admiral (d. 1857)
  - Patrick Syme, Scottish painter (d. 1845)
- September 19
  - Giuseppe Caspar Mezzofanti, Italian cardinal and hyperpolyglot (d. 1849)
  - Coulson Wallop, English politician (d. 1807)
- September 21 – John Peter Grant, Scottish politician (d. 1848)
- September 24
  - Robert Gilmor Jr., shipowner and art collector (d. 1848)
  - Michael Linning, Scottish solicitor (d. 1838)
  - Mariano Sánchez de Loria, Argentine politician (d. 1842)
- September 25
  - Judith Lomax, American poet and religious writer (d. 1828)
  - Nikolaus von Maillot de la Treille, German general (d. 1834)
- September 26 – Johnny Appleseed, (John Chapman), American nurseryman and Swedenborgian missionary (d. 1845)
- September 27
  - John Griscom, American chemist (d. 1852)
  - Bredo Henrik von Munthe af Morgenstierne Sr., Norwegian jurist (d. 1835)
- September 28
  - Sir James Colquhoun, 3rd Baronet, of Luss, politician (d. 1836)
  - Sebastian von Schrenck, German politician (d. 1848)
- September 30
  - Charles-Étienne Chaussegros de Léry, Canadian politician (d. 1842)
  - George Mathews, American judge (d. 1836)

=== October ===
- October 2 – Johannes Spitler, American painter of furniture (d. 1837)
- October 4
  - Francis Ommanney, British MP (d. 1840)
  - Henry Siddons, British actor (d. 1815)
- October 7
  - Ferdinando Orlandi, Italian composer (d. 1848)
  - Jean Thienpont, Belgian politician and lawyer (d. 1863)
- October 8
  - Henry Duncan, British geologist, priest and social reformer (d. 1846)
  - John Ely, American politician (d. 1849)
  - Teis Lundegaard, Norwegian politician (d. 1856)
- October 10 – Peter Nourse, American clergyman (d. 1840)
- October 12
  - George J. F. Clarke, prominent citizen of East Florida (d. 1836)
  - Karoline von Feuchtersleben, German noblewoman (d. 1842)
  - Luis Eduardo Pérez, President of Uruguay (d. 1841)
- October 13
  - William Astell, English banker and politician (d. 1847)
  - Samuel McKee, American politician and lawyer (d. 1826)
- October 15 – John Boit, one of the first Americans involved in the maritime fur trade (d. 1829)
- October 18
  - Adolf Müllner, German writer (d. 1829)
  - Sarah Thompson, Countess Rumford, philanthropist (d. 1852)
- October 19 – Charles Cornwallis, 2nd Marquess Cornwallis, British noble (d. 1823)
- October 21 – Archibald Campbell, British Army officer (d. 1838)
- October 23
  - Adam Otto von Bistram, Baltic German military personnel in Imperial Russian service (d. 1828)
  - René de Chazet, French writer (d. 1844)
- October 26 – Albert Gregorius, Belgian painter (d. 1853)
- October 27 – Alexander Baring, 1st Baron Ashburton, British politician (d. 1848)
- October 28
  - John Boyle, United States federal judge and member of the U.S. House of Representatives (d. 1835)
  - Konstanty Adam Czartoryski, Polish noble and art collector (d. 1860)
- October 29 – Augustin Joseph Caron, French military officer (d. 1822)
- October 30
  - Pierre Barrois, French soldier and officer (d. 1860)
  - Clarkson Crolius, American politician (d. 1843)

=== November ===
- November 1
  - Alexander Caldwell, American judge (d. 1839)
  - René Perin, French playwright (d. 1858)
- November 2 – Georges-Simon Serullas, French pharmacist (d. 1832)
- November 3 – Jakov Jakšić, Serbian postmaster (d. 1848)
- November 4
  - Robert Allan, poet (d. 1841)
  - Johannes P. Bøe, Norwegian politician (d. 1859)
  - Carlos María de Bustamante, Mexican politician (d. 1848)
  - John Warrock, American publisher (d. 1858)
  - Ignaz Heinrich von Wessenberg, German historian (d. 1860)
- November 5
  - William Berry, English genealogist (d. 1851)
  - Johann Christian August Clarus, German surgeon (d. 1854)
- November 6
  - David Bevan, banker (d. 1846)
  - Joseph Récamier, French gynaecologist (d. 1852)
- November 7
  - Richard Noel-Hill, 4th Baron Berwick, British peer (d. 1848)
  - Ebenezer F. Norton, American politician (d. 1851)
- November 8
  - Lord Frederick Montagu, British politician (d. 1827)
  - Robert Reid, British architect (d. 1856)
- November 9
  - Thomas Fortescue Kennedy, Royal Navy officer during the French Revolutionary Wars and Napoleonic Wars (d. 1846)
  - Louis Hayes Petit, English barrister and politician (d. 1849)
- November 10 – John Miller, New York politician (d. 1862)
- November 11 – Marcin Dunin, Roman Catholic archbishop of Gnesen and Posen (d. 1842)
- November 12
  - Charles Bell, British surgeon and artist (d. 1842)
  - Joachim Zachris Duncker, Swedish soldier (d. 1809)
- November 14 – Gaspare Spontini, Italian composer and conductor (d. 1851)
- November 17 – Pierre-Alexandre Le Camus, French politician (d. 1824)
- November 18
  - William Horsley, English musician (d. 1858)
  - Wilhelmine of Prussia, Queen of the Netherlands, Dutch queen consort (from 1815 to 1837); second daughter and fourth child of Frederick William II of Prussia and Frederica Louisa of Hesse-Darmstadt (d. 1837)
- November 19 – Vasile Moga, Romanian orthodox bishop of Sibiu (d. 1845)
- November 20
  - Archibald Cregeen, Manx lexicographer (d. 1841)
  - Henrik Steenbuch, Norwegian lawyer (d. 1839)
- November 21
  - Domingo French, Argentine revolutionary (d. 1825)
  - Elisabeth Canori Mora, Italian Roman Catholic mystic (d. 1825)
- November 24 – Thomas Dick, British astronomer (d. 1857)
- November 25 – Francisco de Paula Marín, A Spaniard influential in the early Kingdom of Hawaii; confidant of Hawaiian King Kamehameha I (d. 1837)
- November 26
  - Georg Ludwig Cancrin, Russian German economist and politician (d. 1845)
  - William Hunter, American politician and diplomat (d. 1849)
  - Peter Frederik Wulff, Danish naval officer (d. 1842)
- November 27 – John Howard Kyan, British inventor (d. 1850)
- November 28
  - Frederick IV, Duke of Saxe-Gotha-Altenburg (d. 1825)
  - Sir Richard King, 2nd Baronet, Royal Navy admiral (d. 1834)
  - Princess Maria Antonia of Parma, Italian princess (d. 1841)
- November 29
  - Carl Johan Fahlcrantz, painter (d. 1861)
  - Johann Gottfried Gruber, German literary critic (d. 1851)

=== December ===
- December 1 – Alexander Leith, British Army officer (d. 1859)
- December 2
  - François-André Baudin, French naval officer (d. 1842)
  - François-René Boussen, Belgian priest (d. 1848)
- December 3 – Giuseppe Federico Palombini, military general (d. 1850)
- December 4 – John Weyland, British writer and politician; (d. 1854)
- December 5 – Johann Wilhelm Andreas Pfaff, German mathematician (d. 1835)
- December 10 – Nicolas Morice, French navy officer (d. 1848)
- December 11 – David Bowen, Felinfoel, Welsh Baptist minister from Felinfoel (d. 1853)
- December 12 – William Henry, English chemist (d. 1836)
- December 13
  - Eline Heger, Danish actress (d. 1842)
  - Nathan F. Dixon I, American politician (d. 1842)
- December 15 – Michel Ange Lancret, Engineer with the French Corps of Bridges and Roads (d. 1807)
- December 16 – Caroline Campbell, Duchess of Argyll, British noble (d. 1835)
- December 17
  - Andrew Jukes, British surgeon (d. 1821)
  - Littleton Waller Tazewell, American politician (d. 1860)
- December 20
  - John Pasco, English admiral (d. 1853)
  - Charles Richard Vaughan, British diplomat (d. 1849)
- December 21
  - John Thomas Barber Beaumont, British artist (d. 1841)
  - James Ingram, English academic (d. 1850)
- December 23 – Ludwig von Vincke, politician, writer and jurist (d. 1844)
- December 26 – Ferdinand Oechsle, German inventor (d. 1852)
- December 27
  - Brenton Halliburton, Canadian judge (d. 1860)
  - Ephraim Hart, American politician (d. 1839)
  - Johann Philipp Neumann, Austrian physicist, librarian and poet (d. 1849)
- December 28
  - Mary Birkett Card, poet, abolitionist and feminist (d. 1817)
  - Thomas Moore Musgrave, English postmaster and translator (d. 1854)
- December 29 – Maurice FitzGerald, 18th Knight of Kerry, British politician (d. 1849)
- December 31 – James Bunbury White, American politician (d. 1819)
- Unknown date – Sergey Glinka, Russian author, brother of Fyodor Glinka (d. 1847)

1775

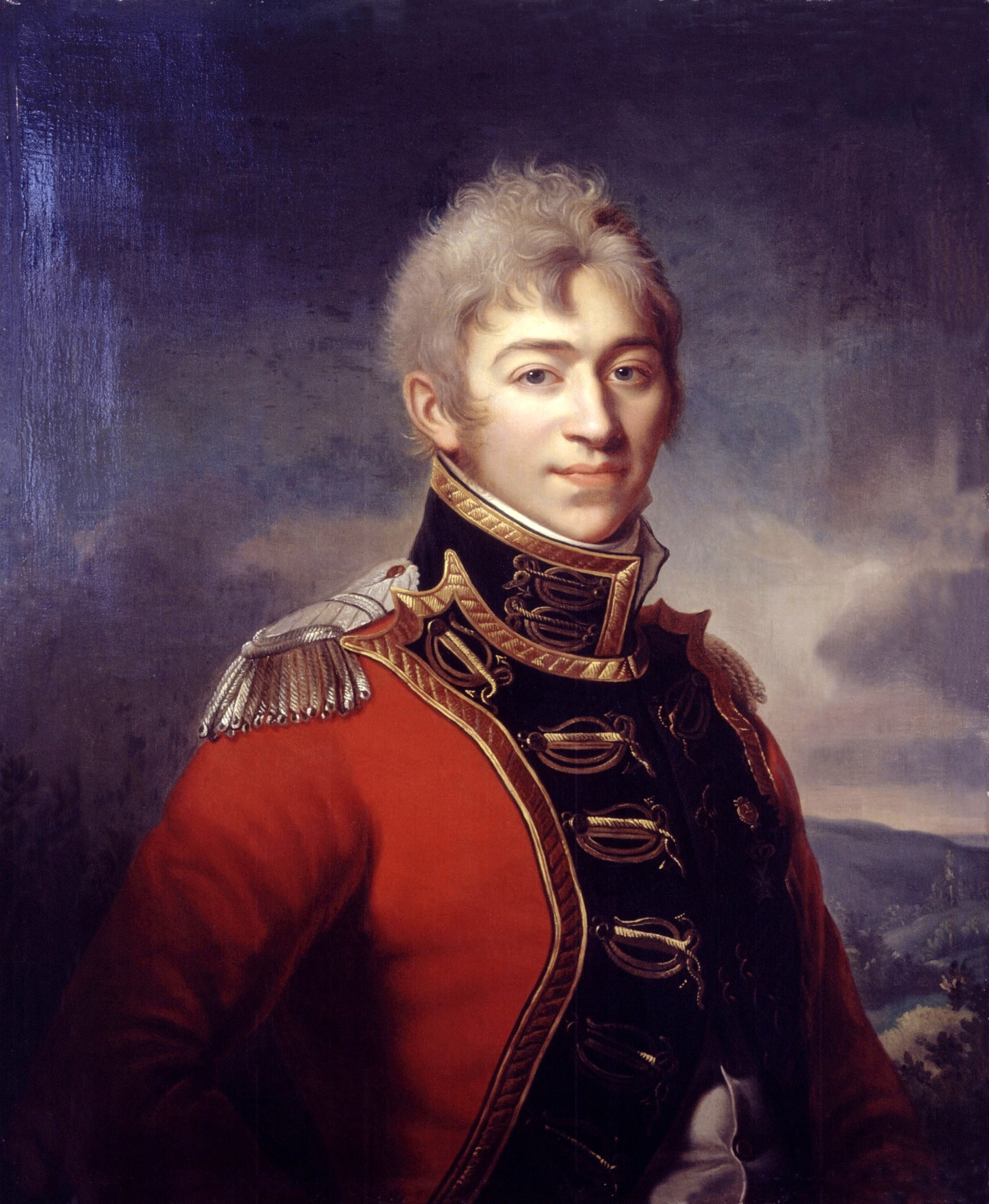
Stanisław Kostka Zamoyski born 13 January

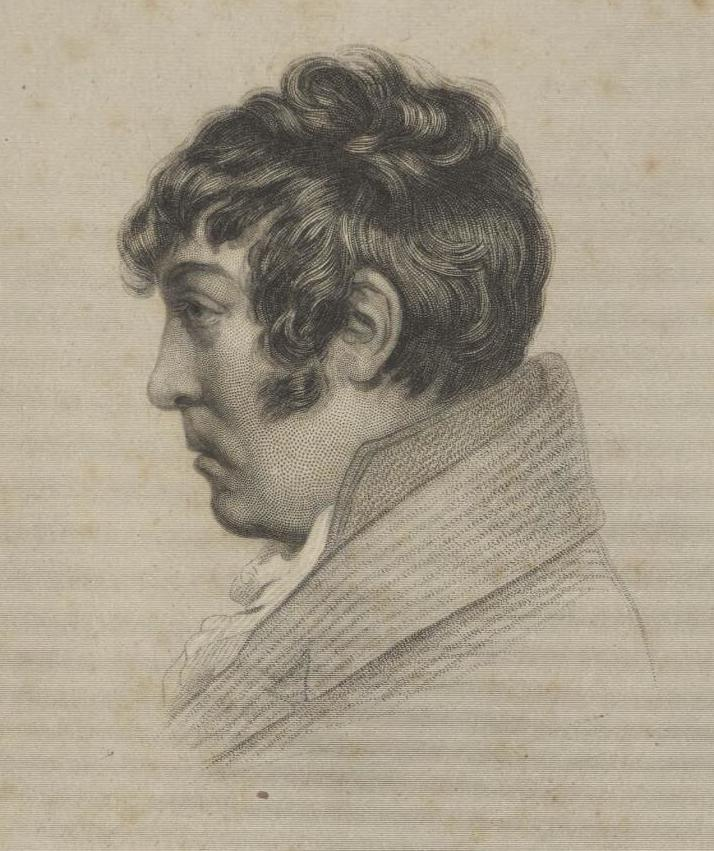
Walter Savage Landor born 30 January

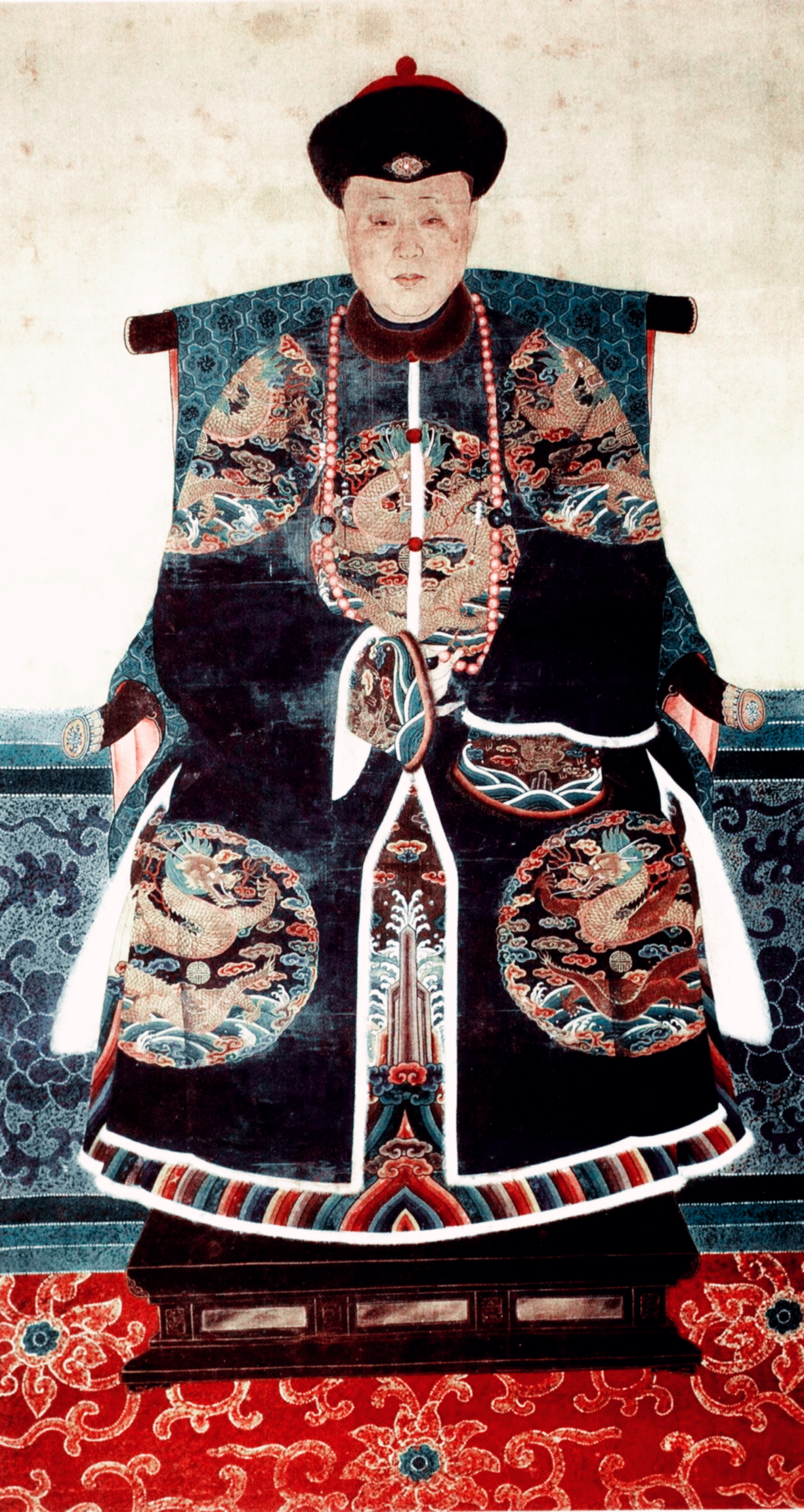
Gurun Princess Hexiao born 2 February

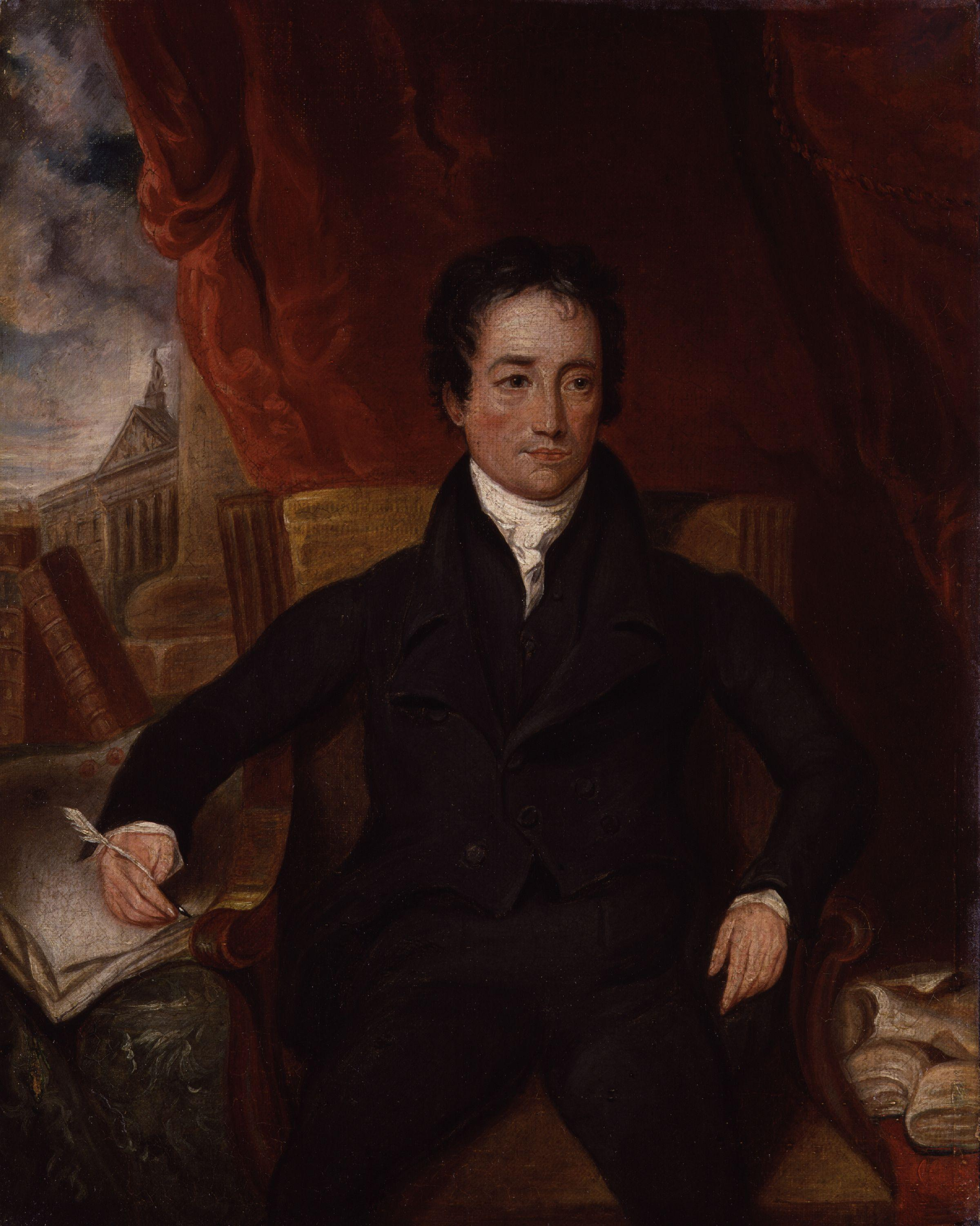
Charles Lamb born 10 February

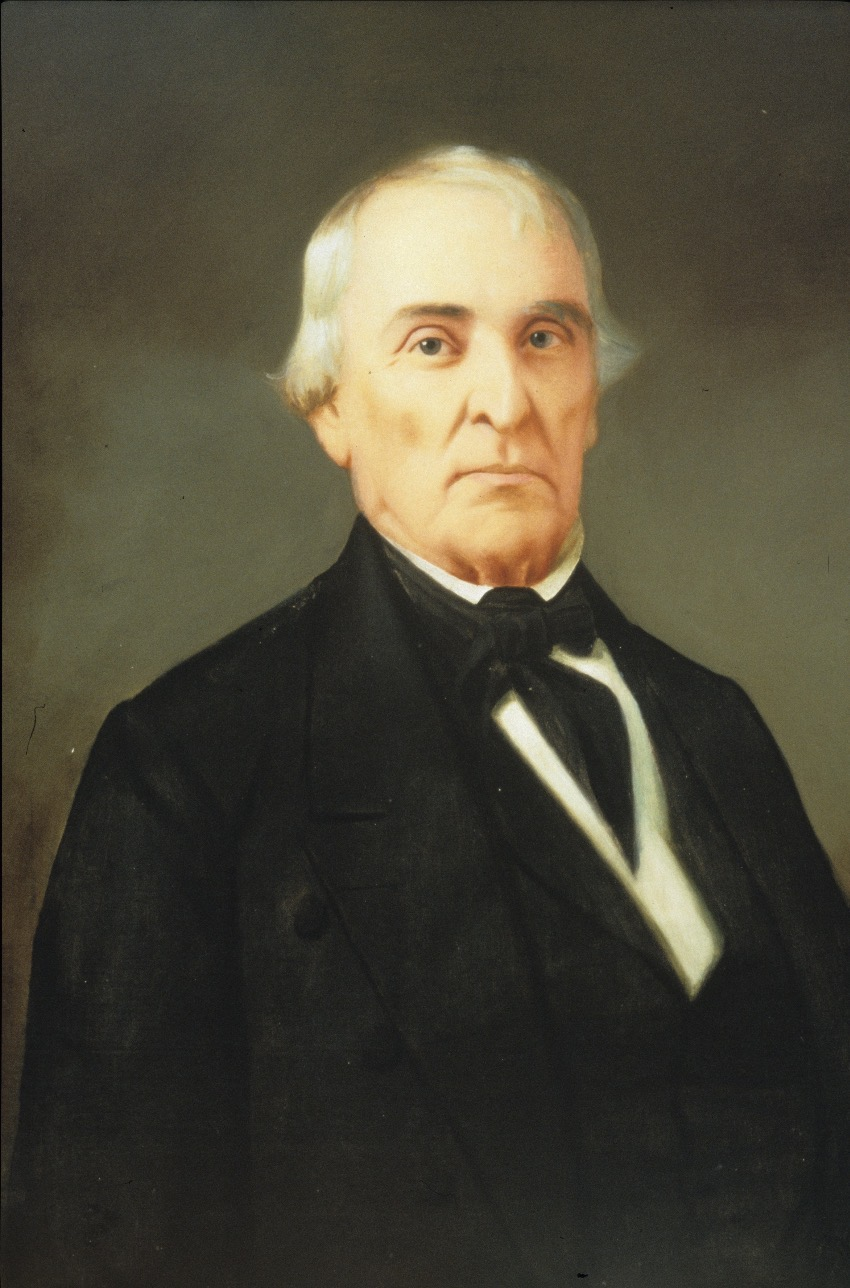
William Hall (governor) born 11 February

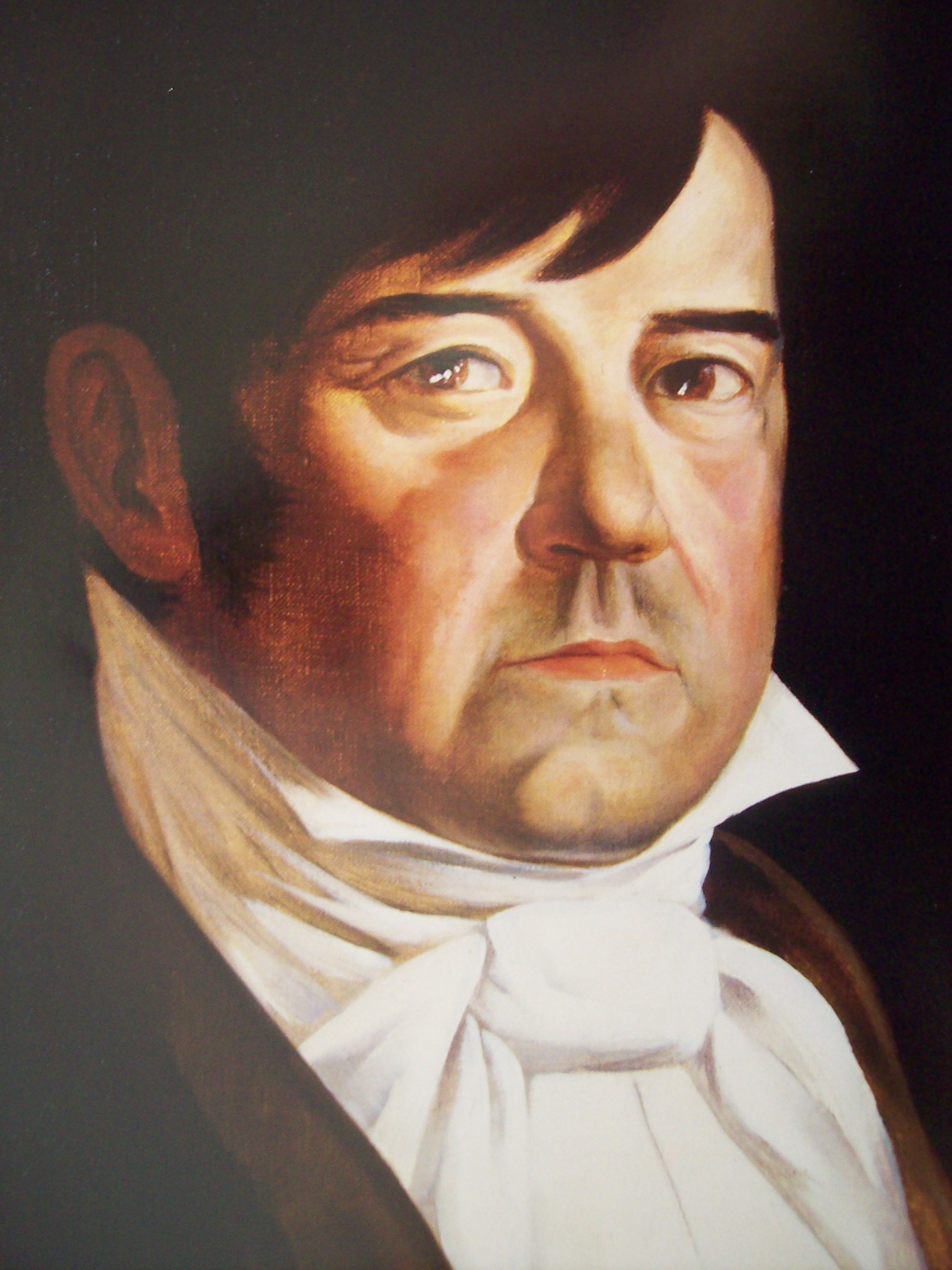
Miguel Ramos Arizpe born 15 February

Simmons Jones Baker born 15 February

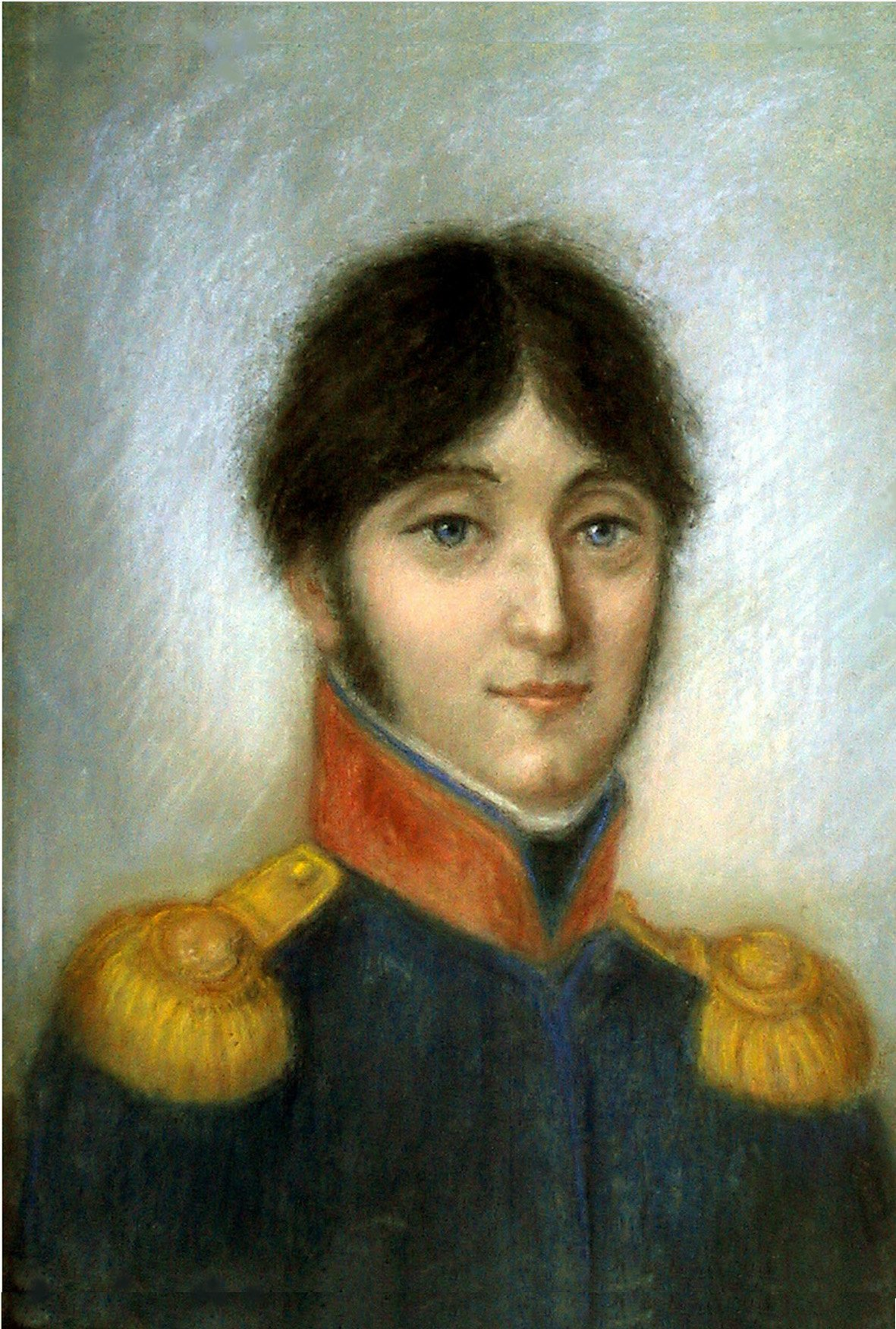
Jean-Baptiste Girard (soldier) born 21 February

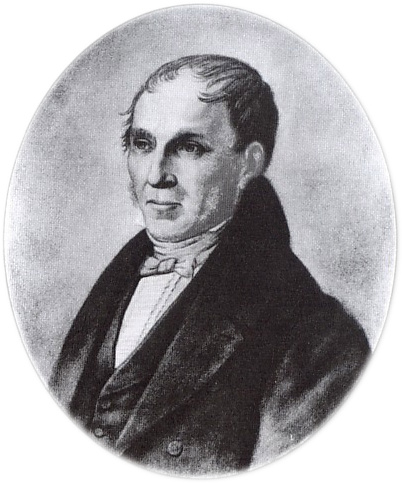
Adolf Stieler born 26 February

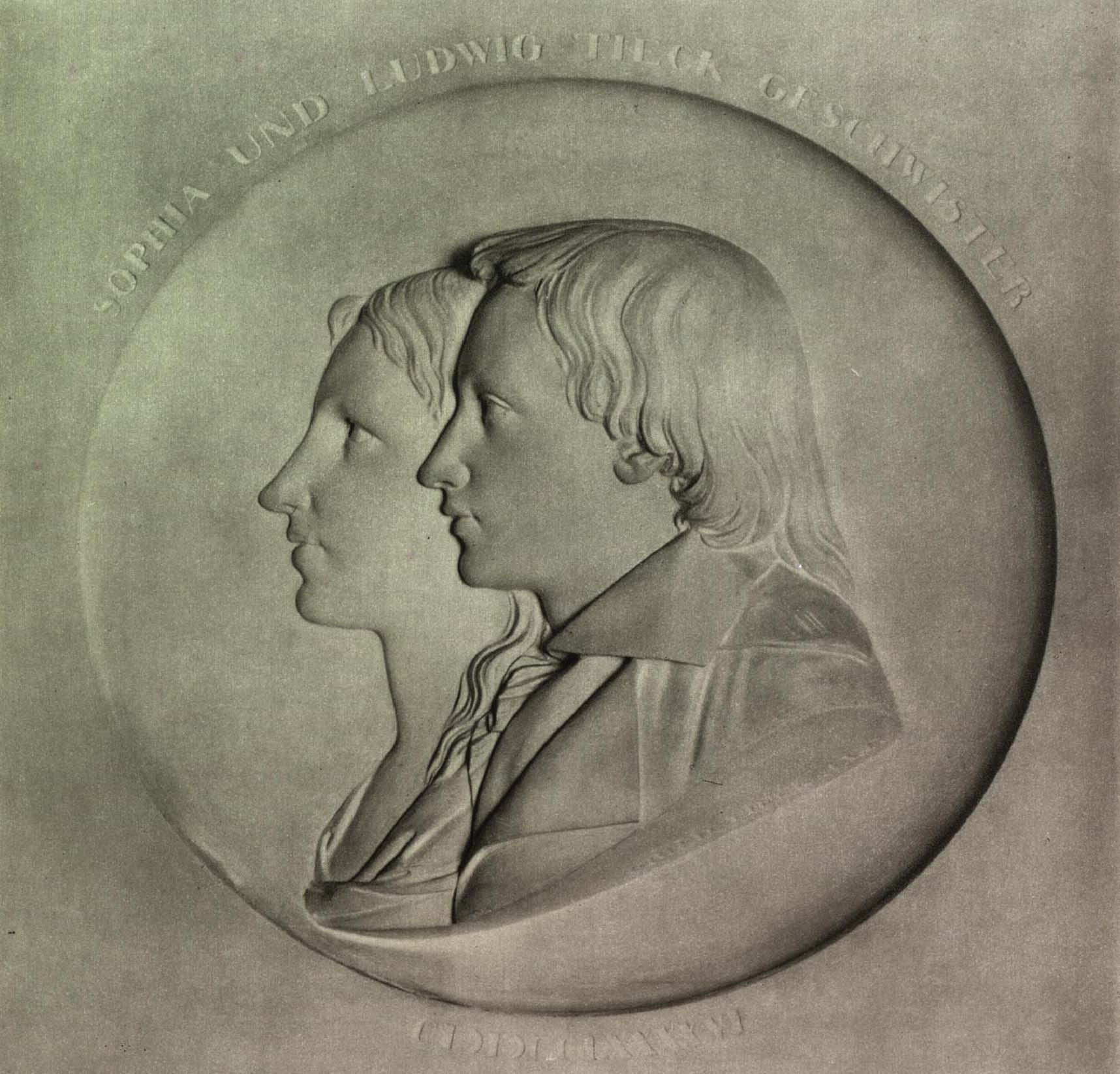
Sophie Tieck born 28 February

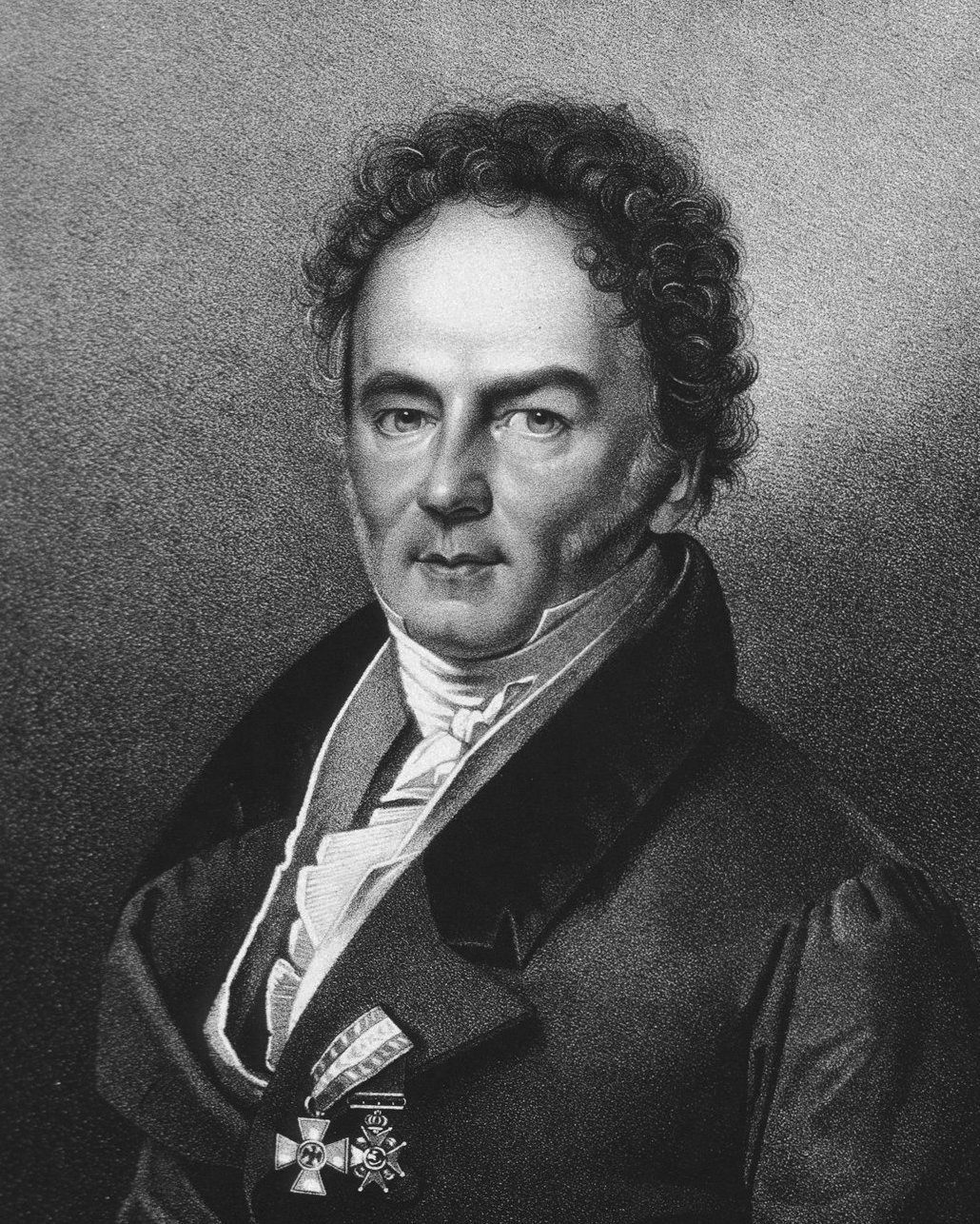
Adam Elias von Siebold born 5 March

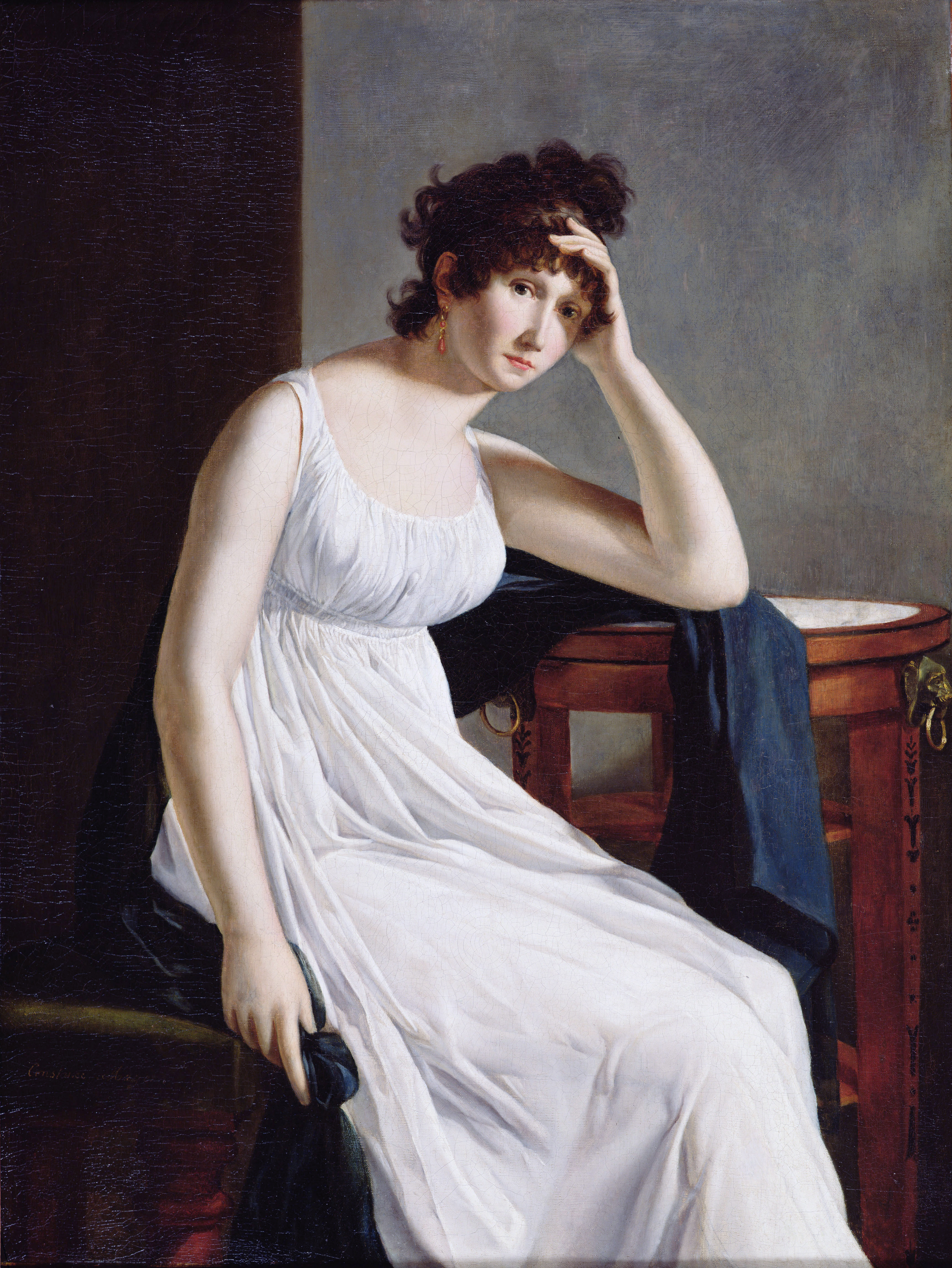
Constance Mayer born 9 March

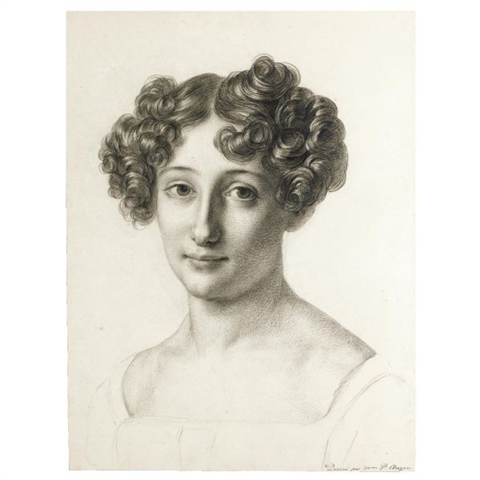
Pauline Auzou born 24 March

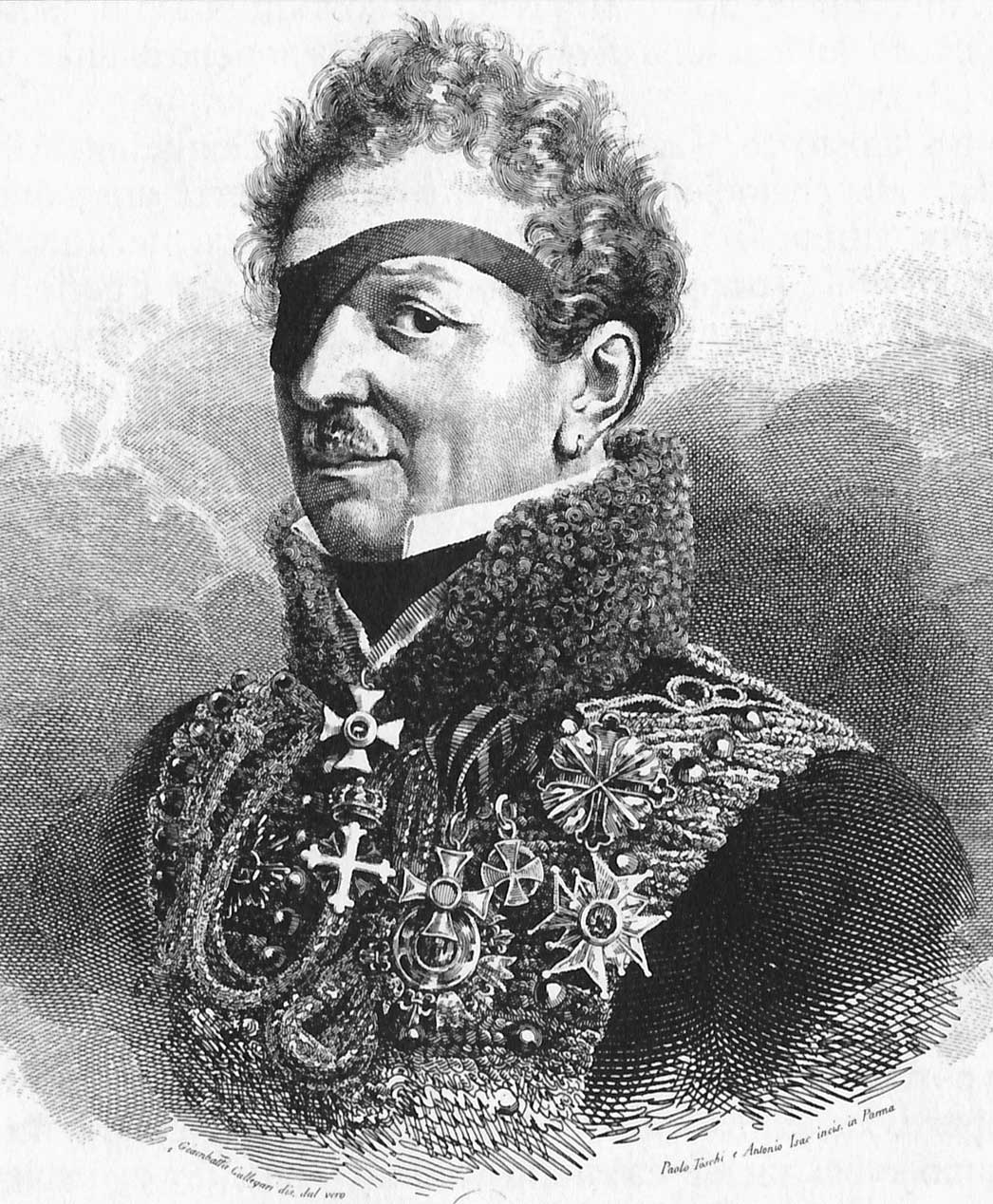
Adam Albert von Neipperg born 8 April

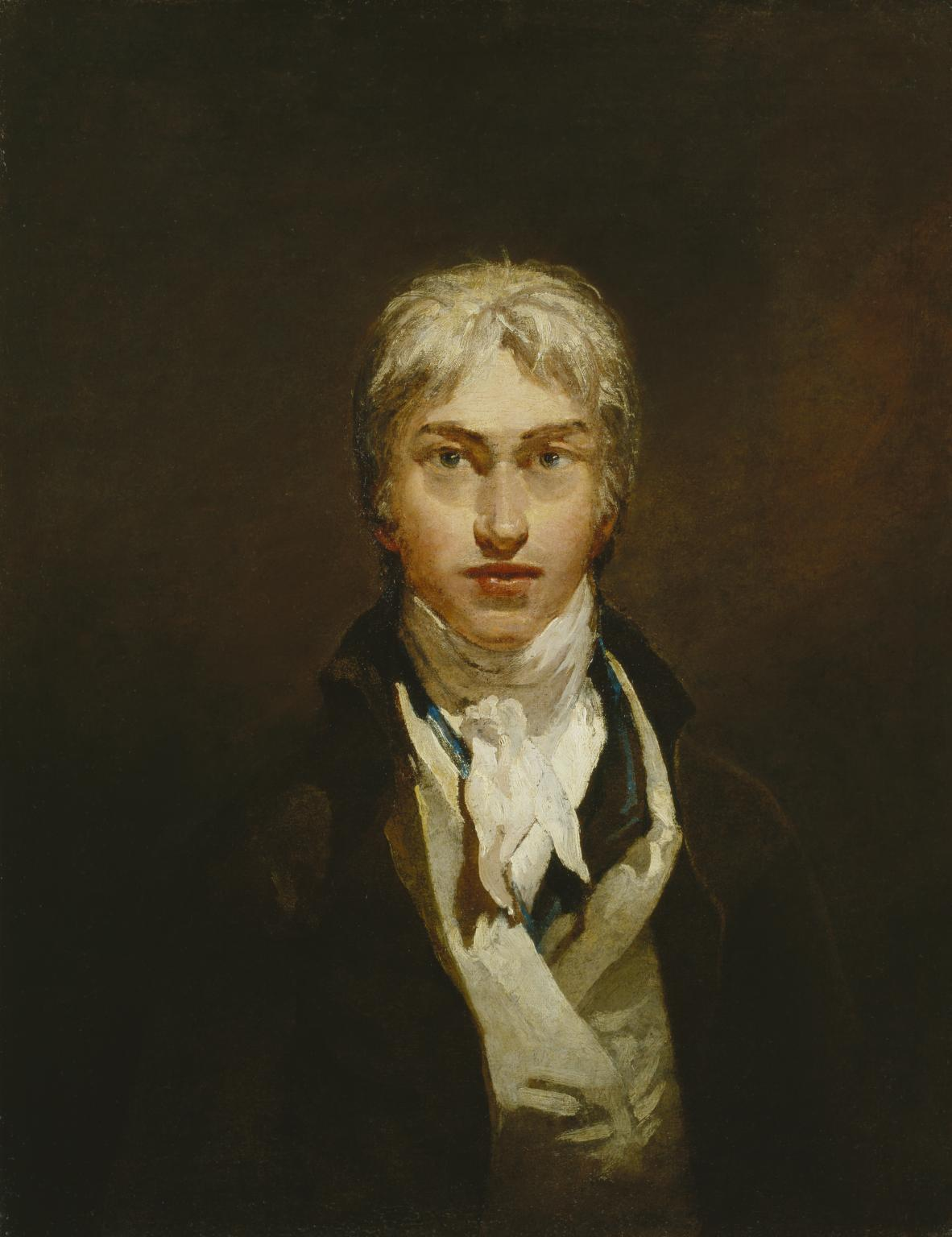
J. M. W. Turner born 23 April

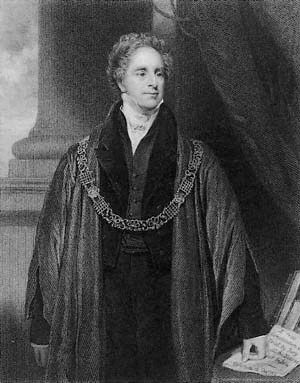
Alexander Johnston (1775–1849) born 25 April

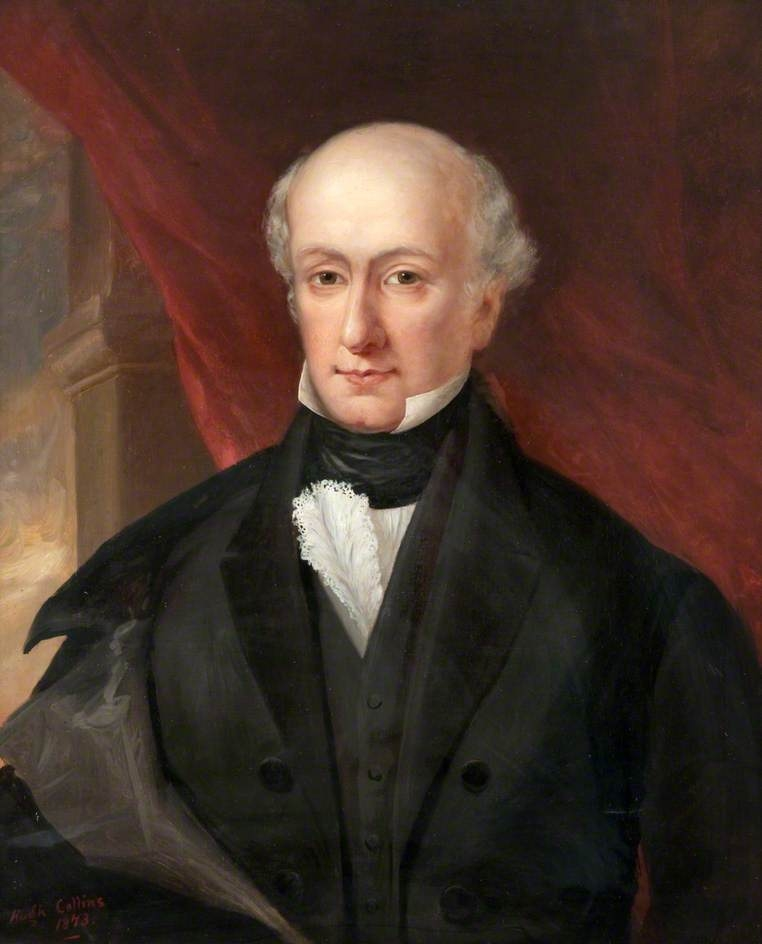
George Kinloch (politician) born 30 April

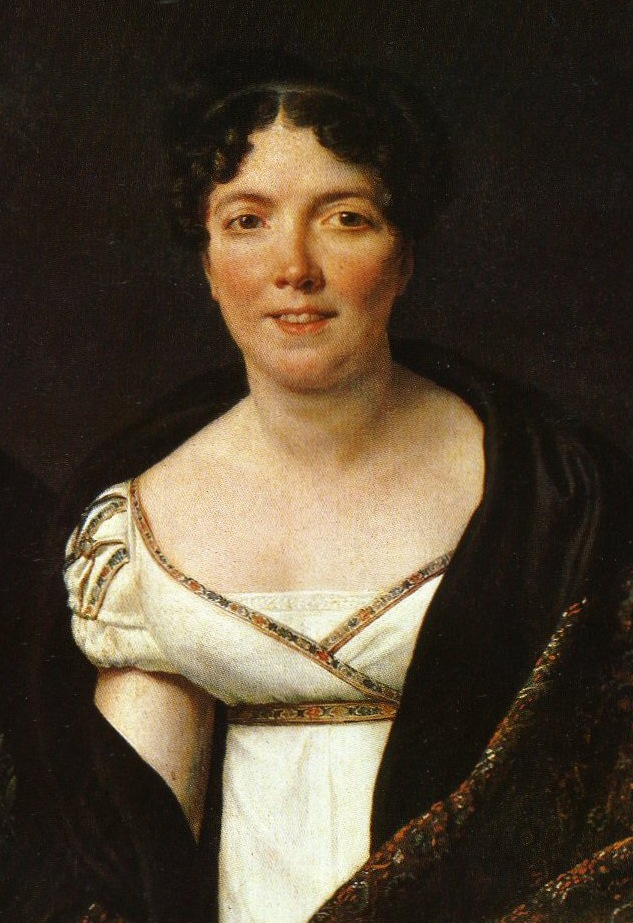
Angélique Mongez born 1 May

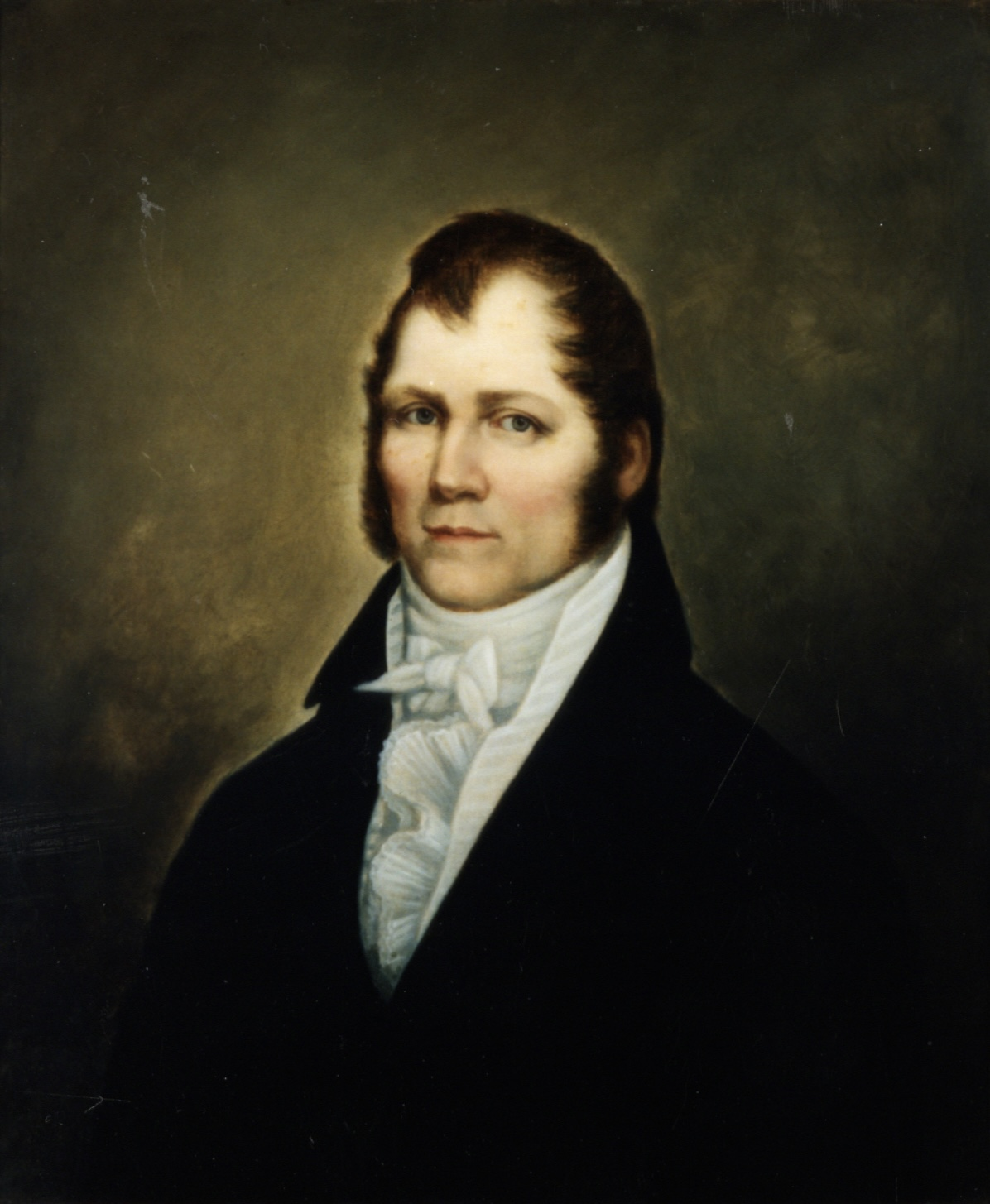
Alexander McNair born 5 May

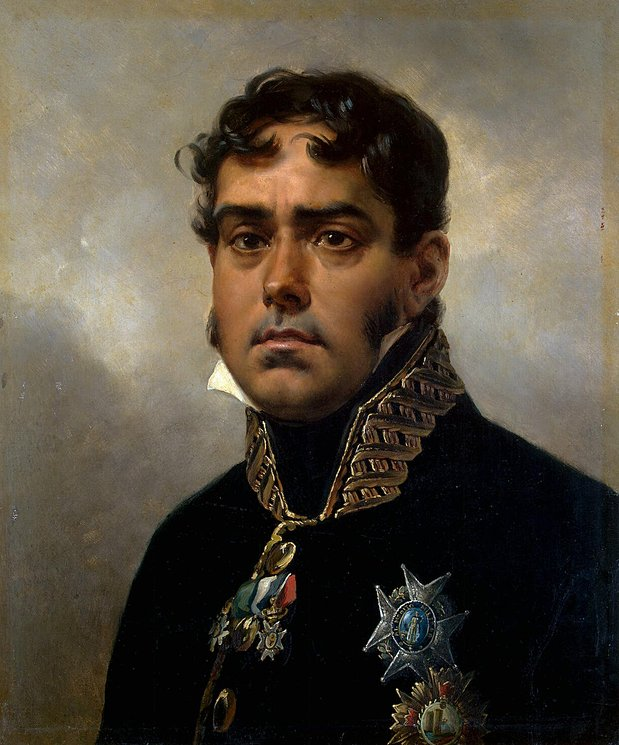
Pablo Morillo born 5 May

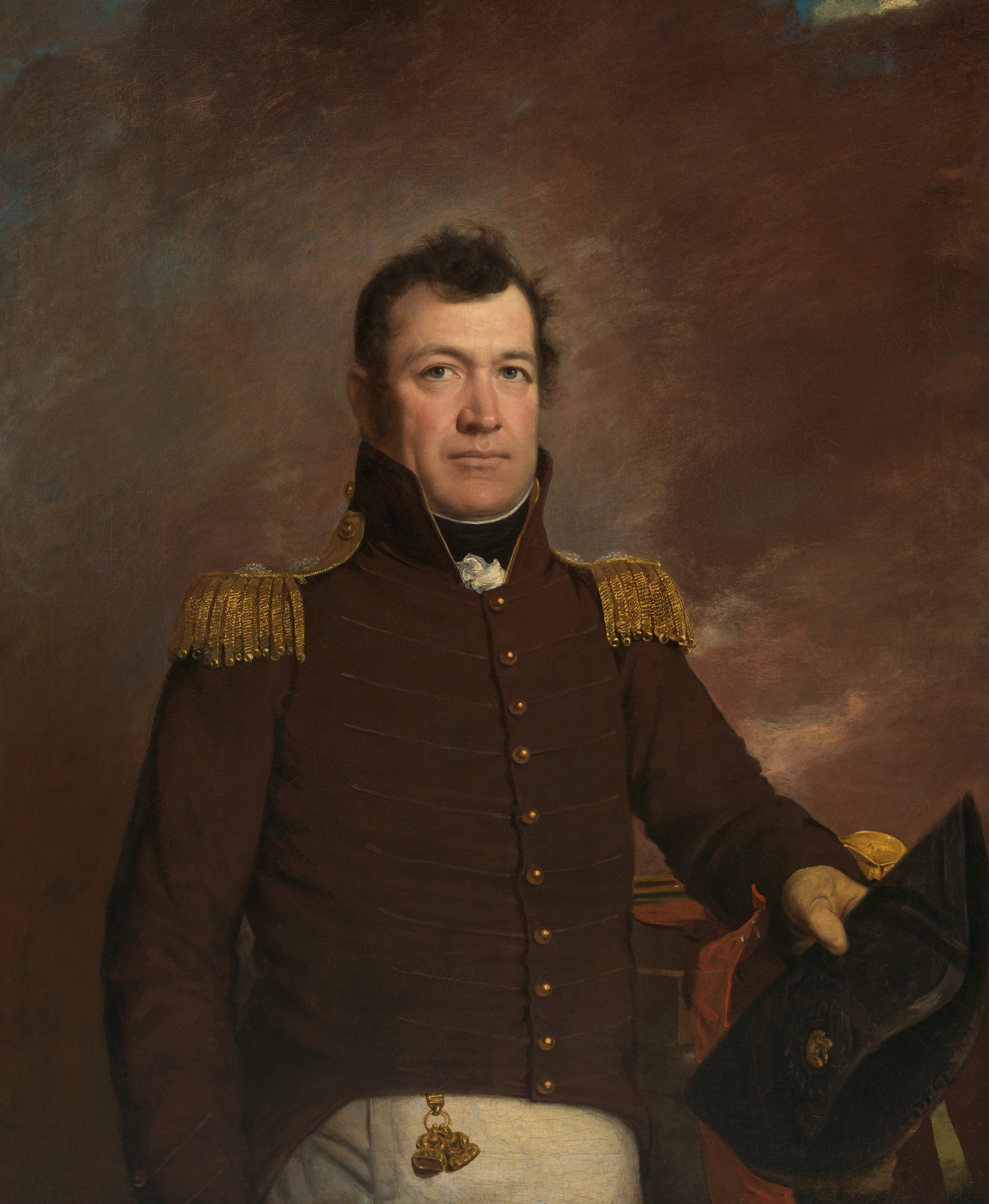
Jacob Brown born 9 May

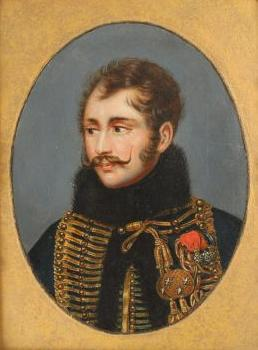
Antoine Charles Louis de Lasalle born 10 May

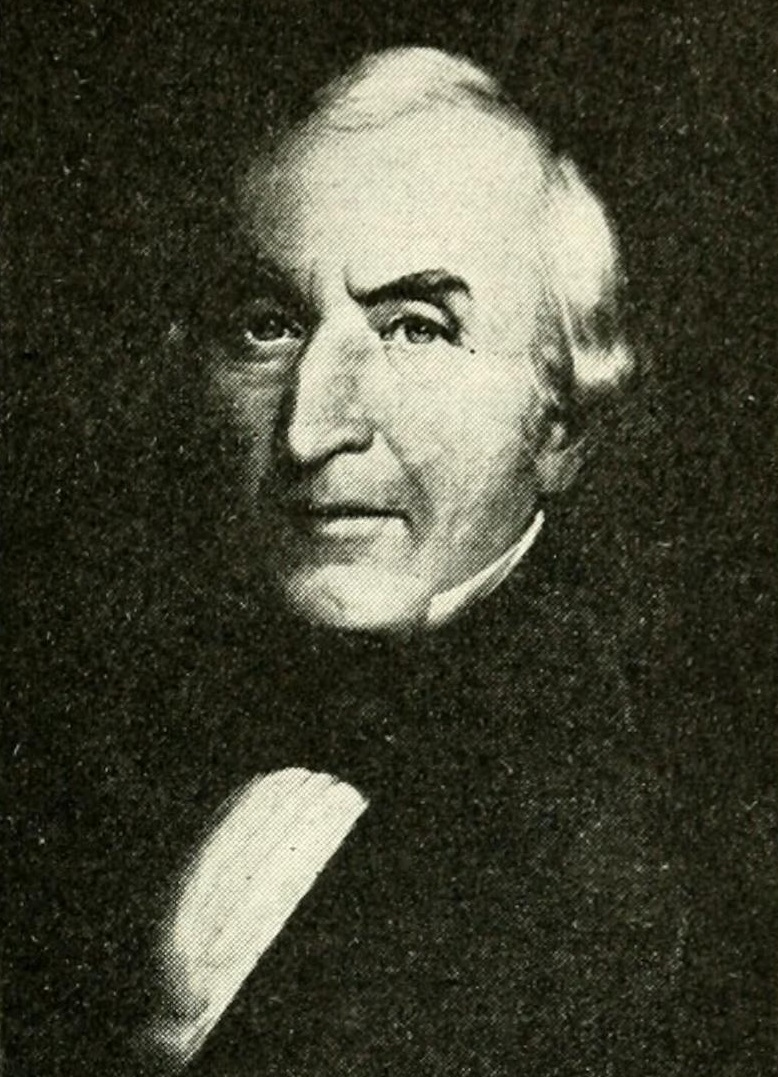
Micah Brooks born 14 May

Johann Baptist Malfatti von Monteregio born 12 June

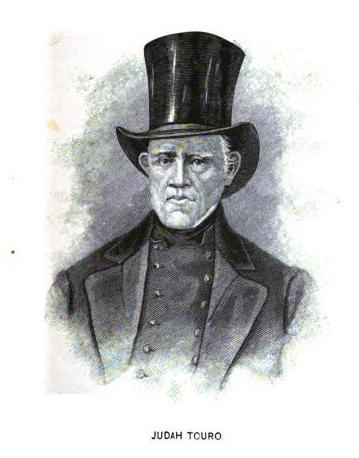
Judah Touro born 16 June

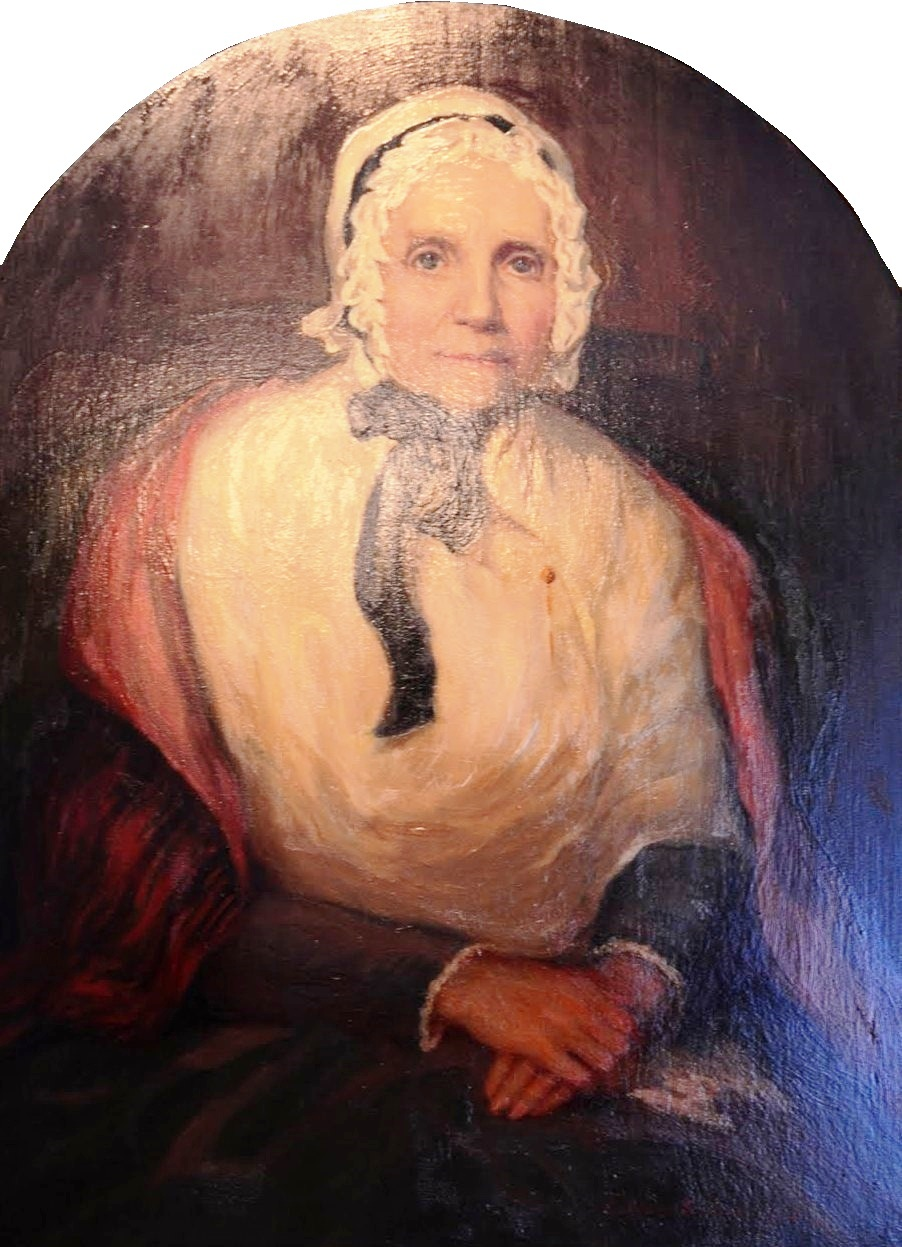
Lucy Mack Smith born 8 July

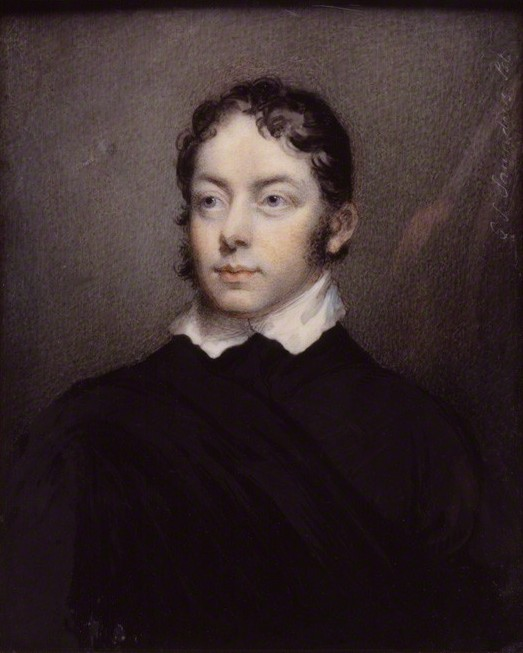
Matthew Lewis (writer) born 9 July

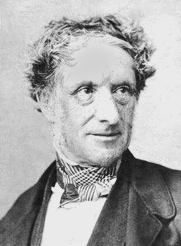
Richard Westmacott born 15 July

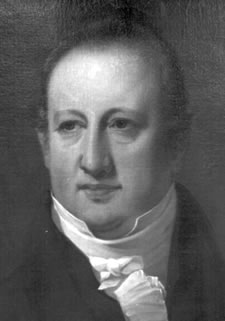
John Andrew Shulze born 19 July

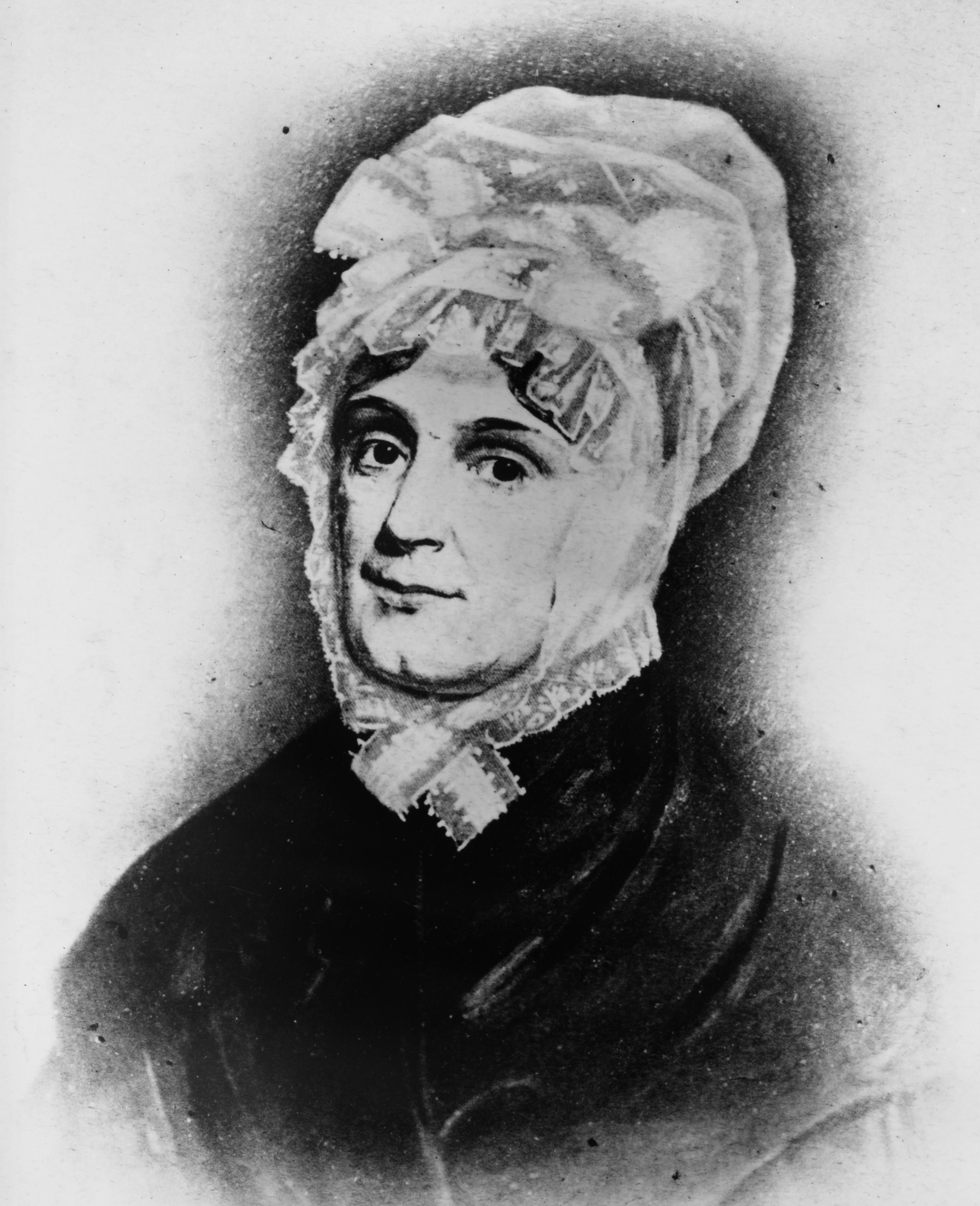
Anna Harrison born 25 July

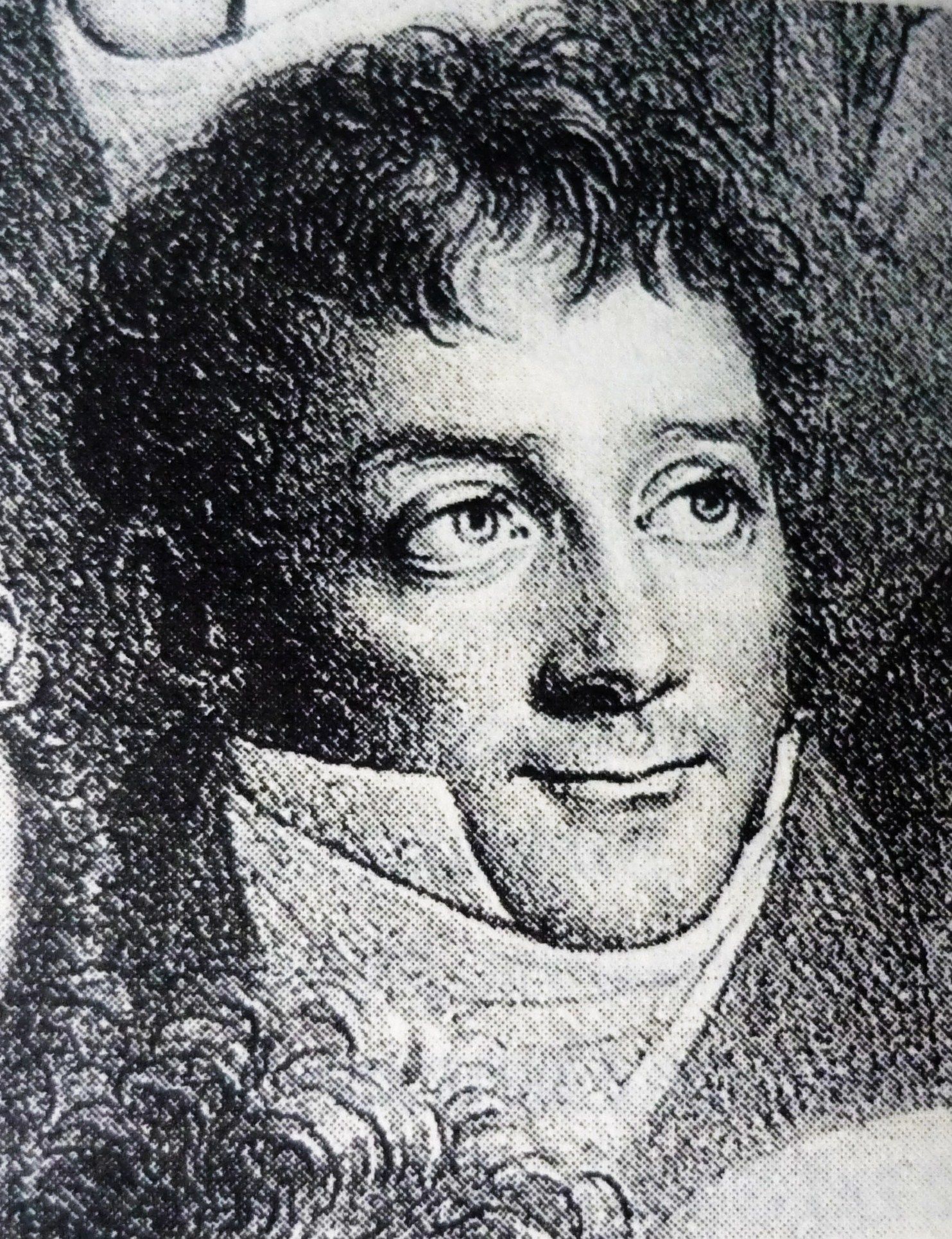
Emmanuel Dupaty born 31 July

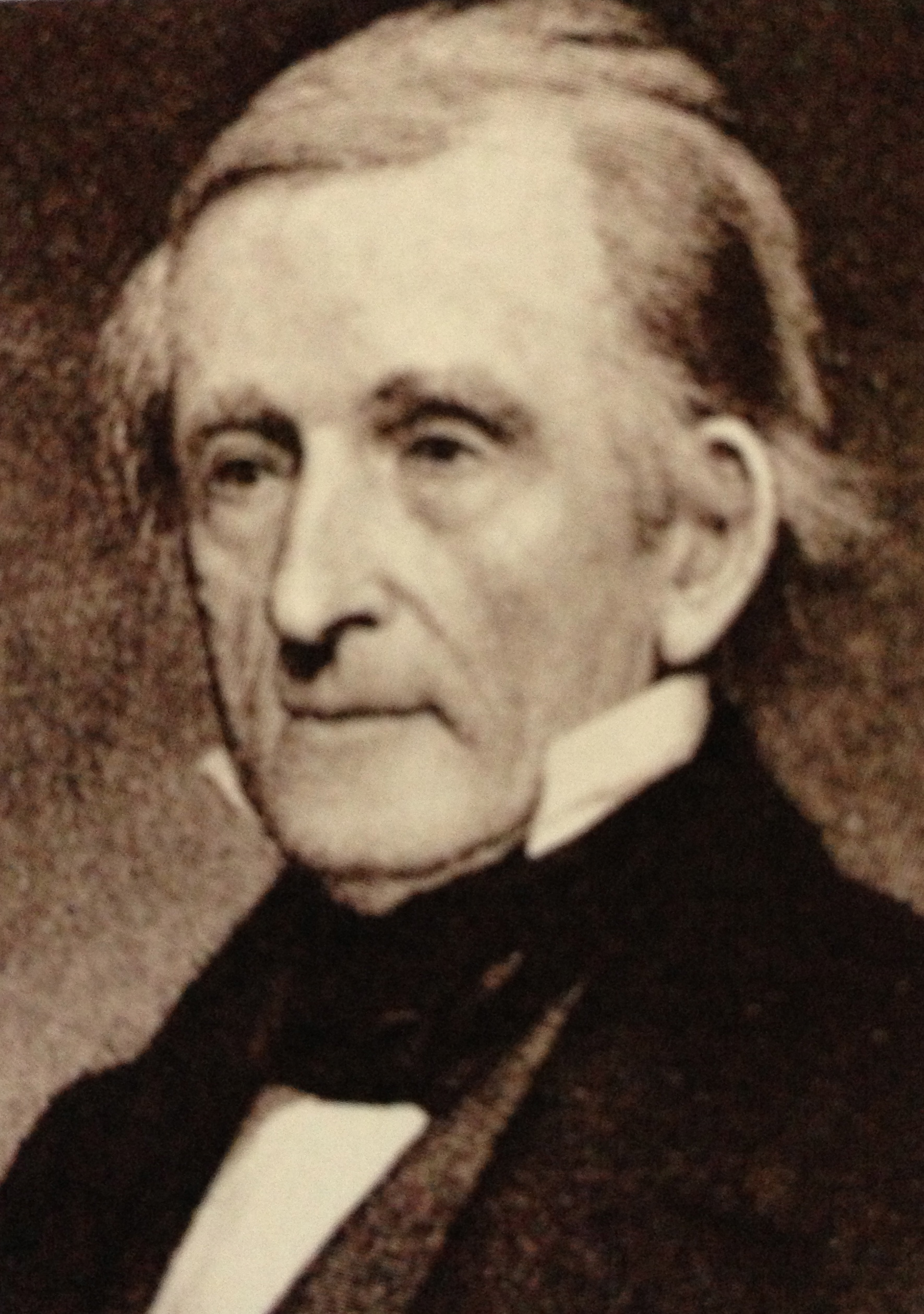
George Tucker (politician) born 20 August

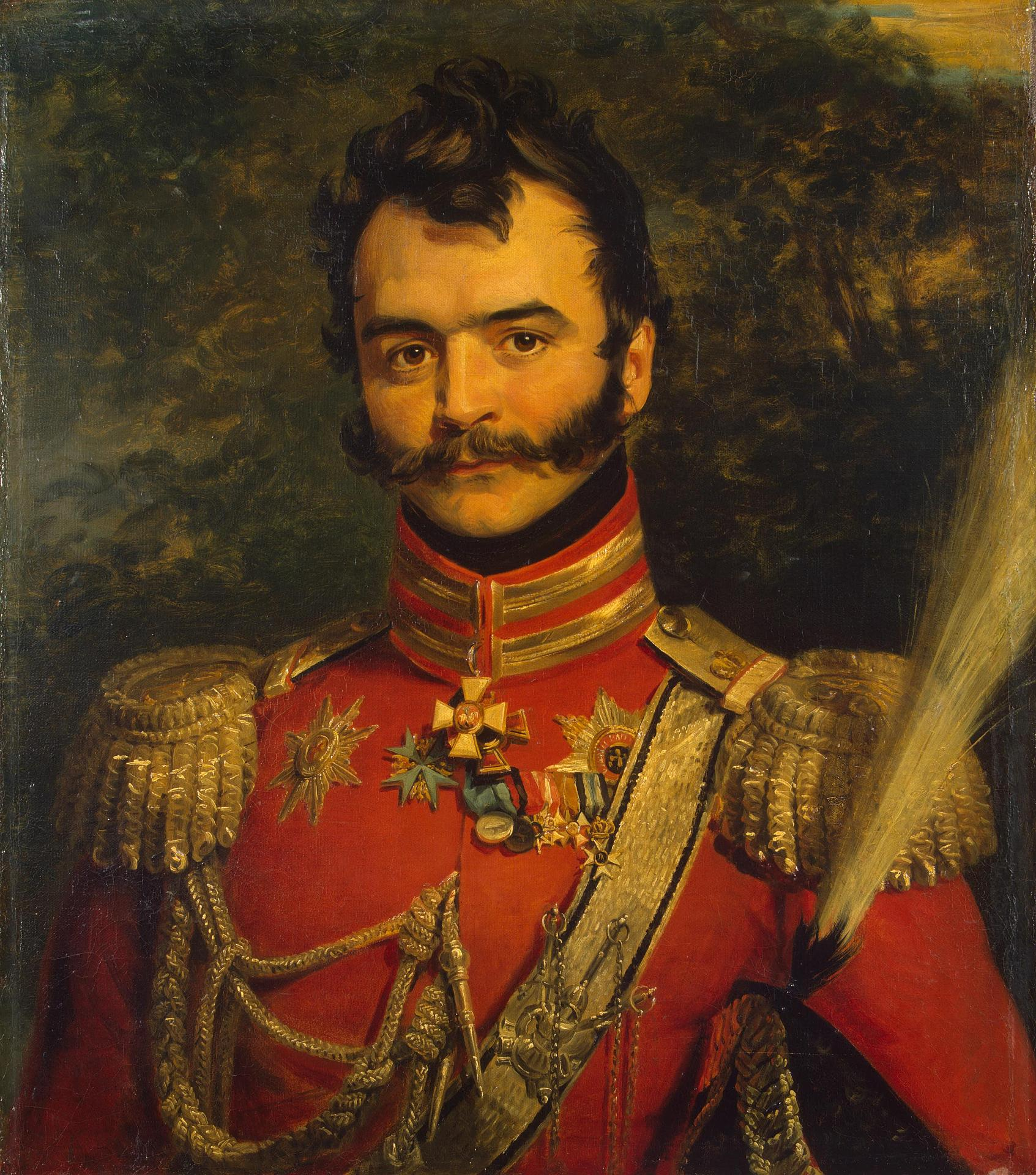
Vasily Orlov-Denisov born 8 September

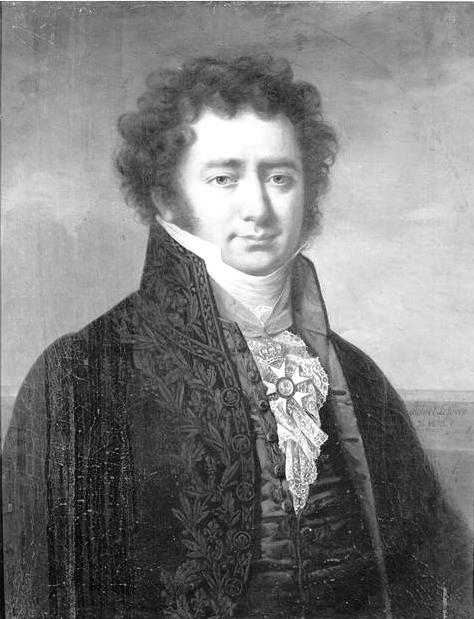
Guillaume Capelle born 9 September

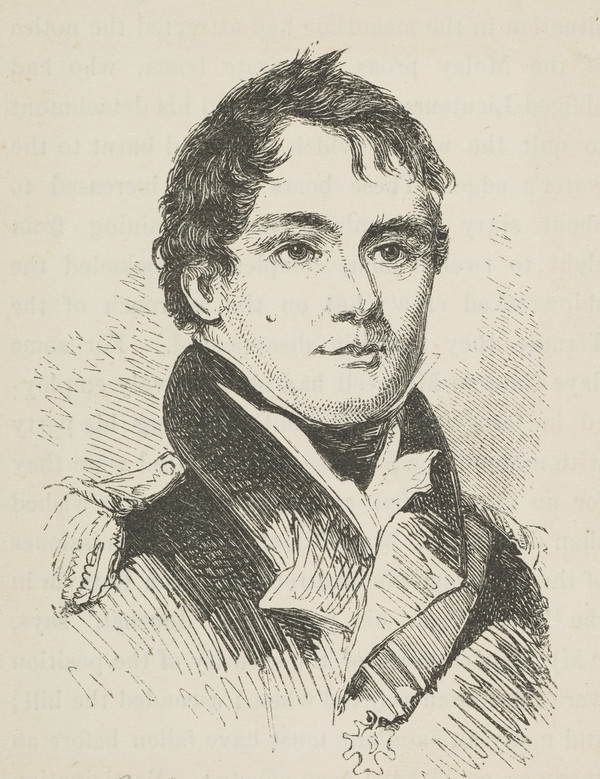
Murray Maxwell born 10 September

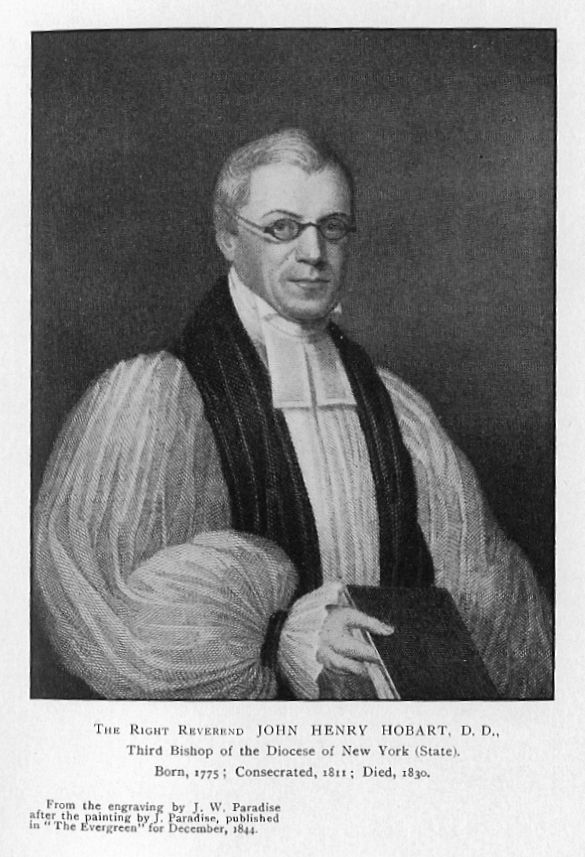
John Henry Hobart born 14 September

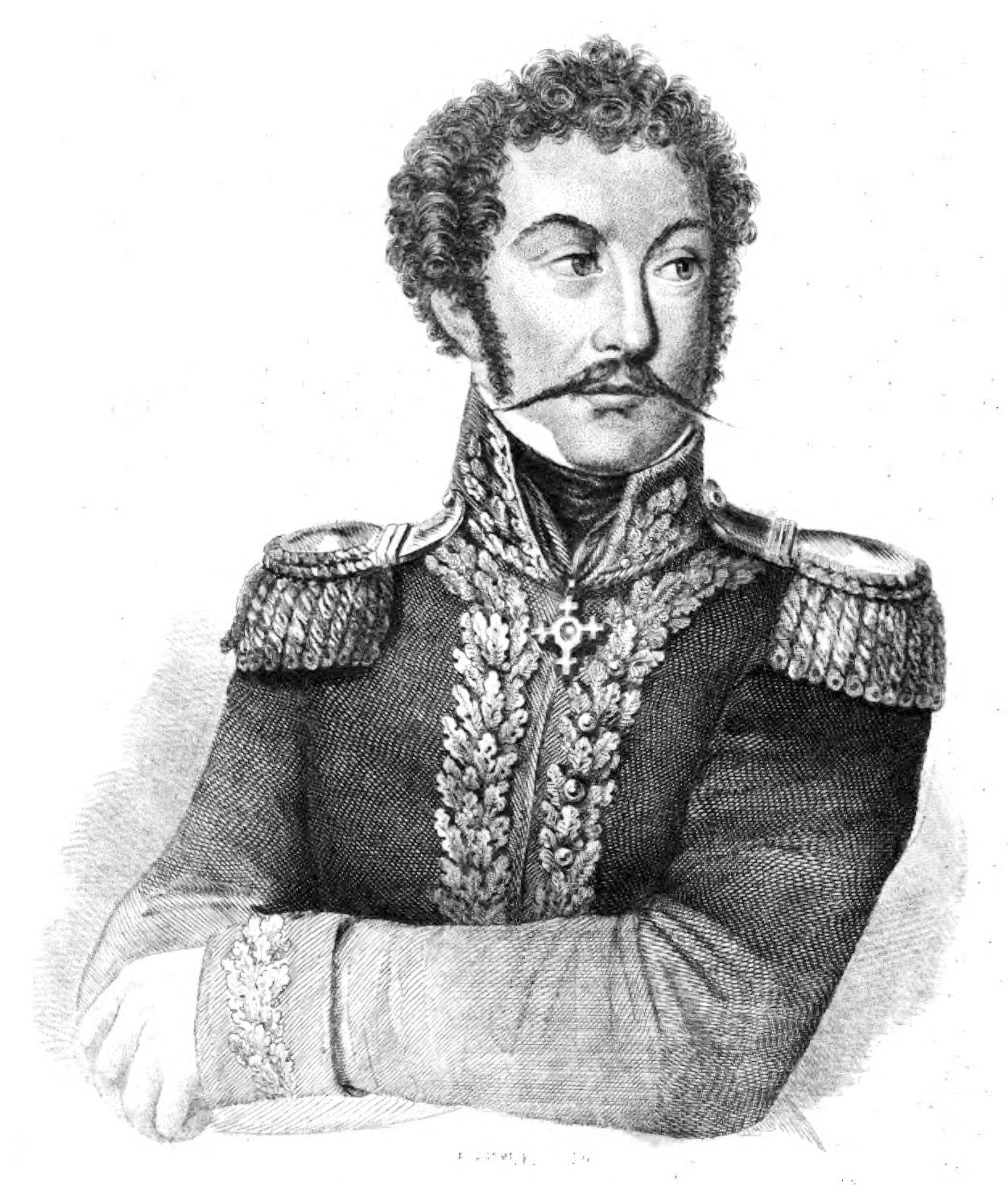
Giuseppe Rosaroll born 16 September

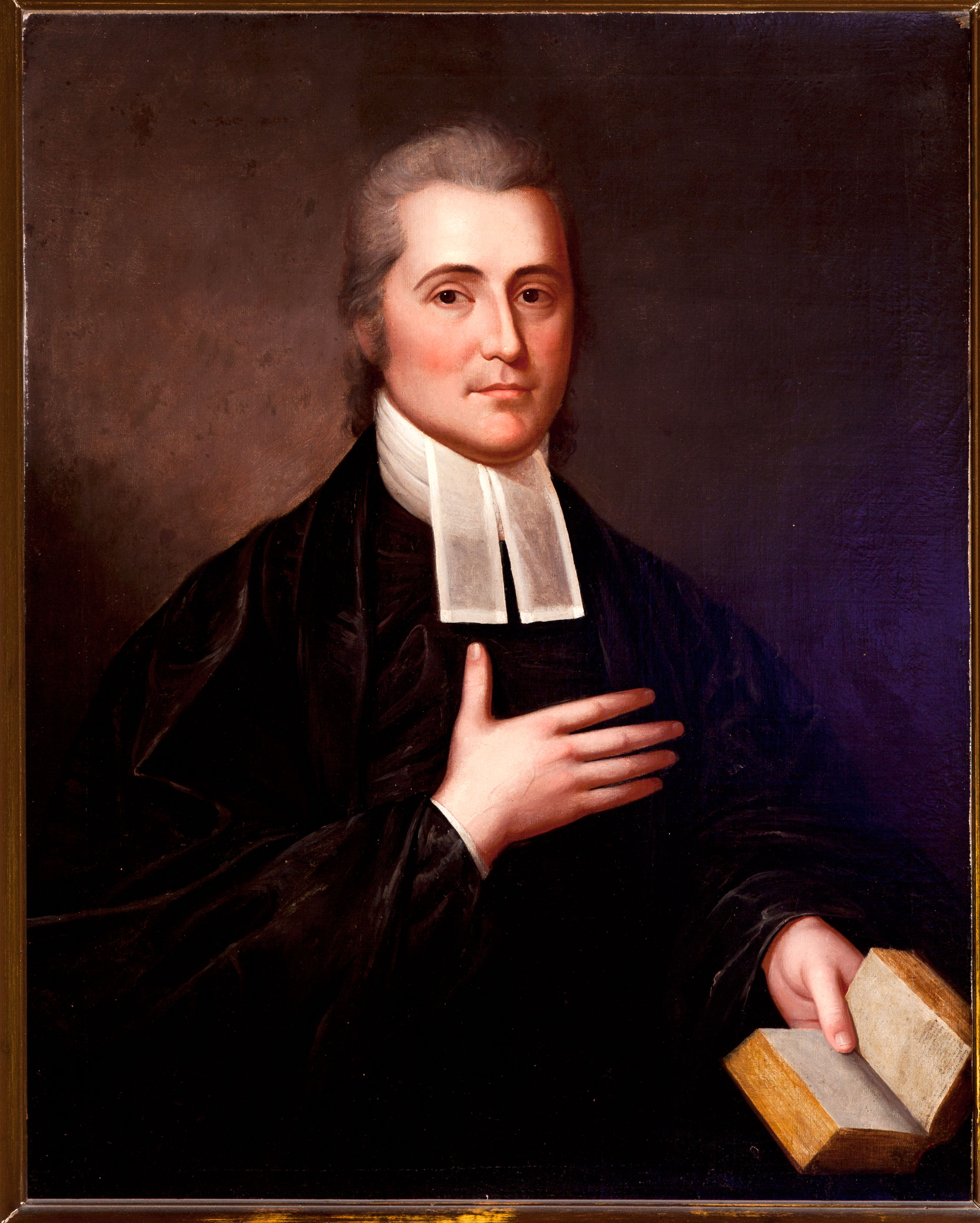
Philip Milledoler born 22 September

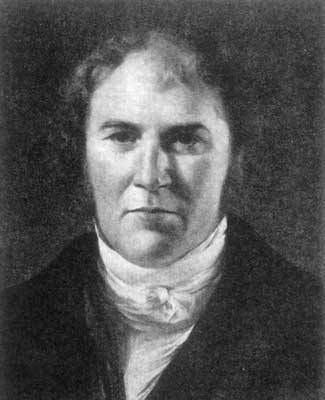
Robert Adrain born 30 September

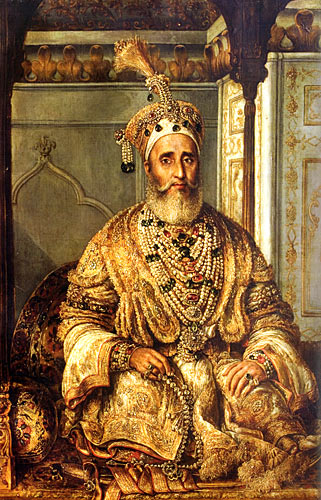
Bahadur Shah Zafar born 24 October

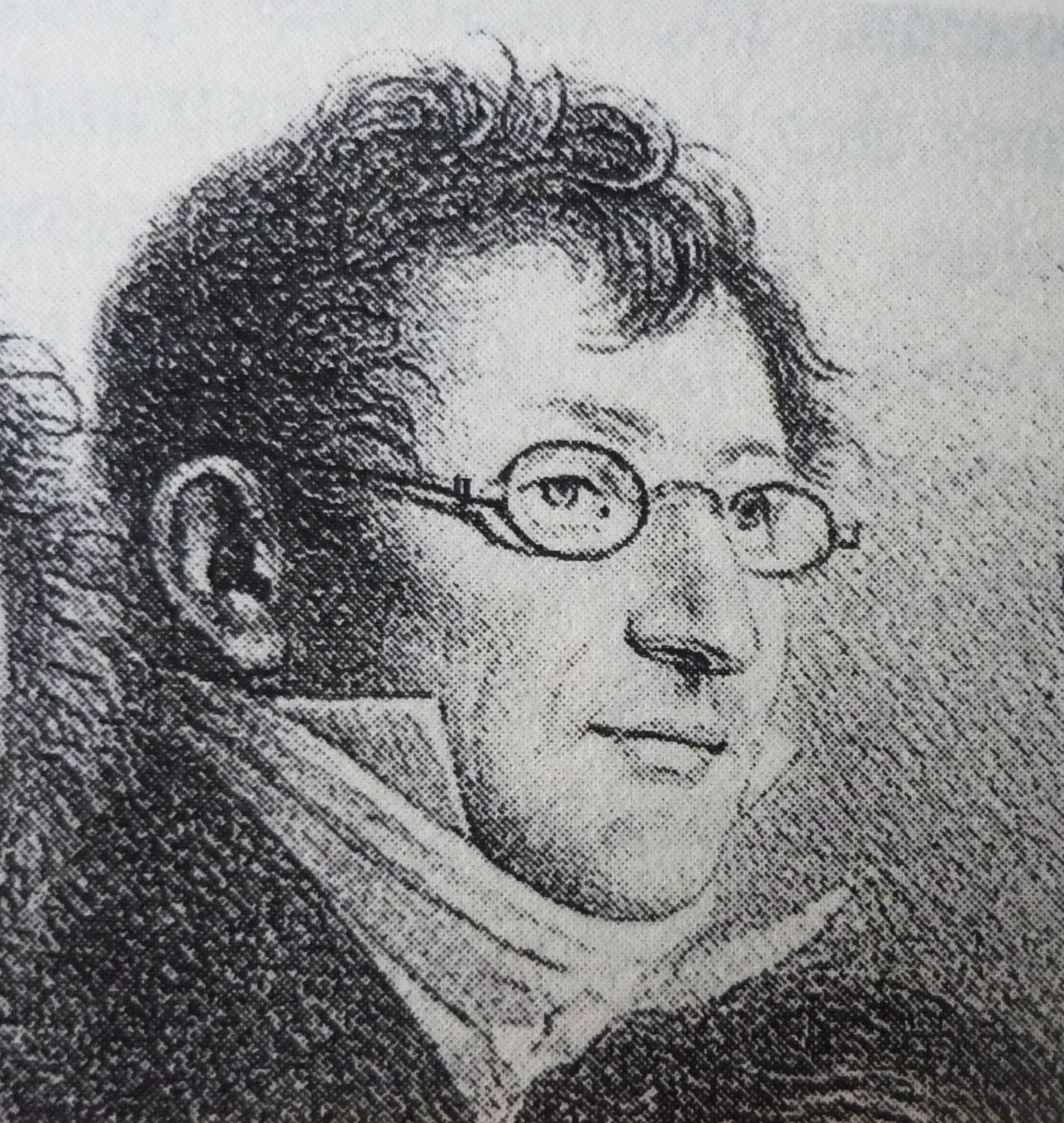
Pierre Capelle born 4 November

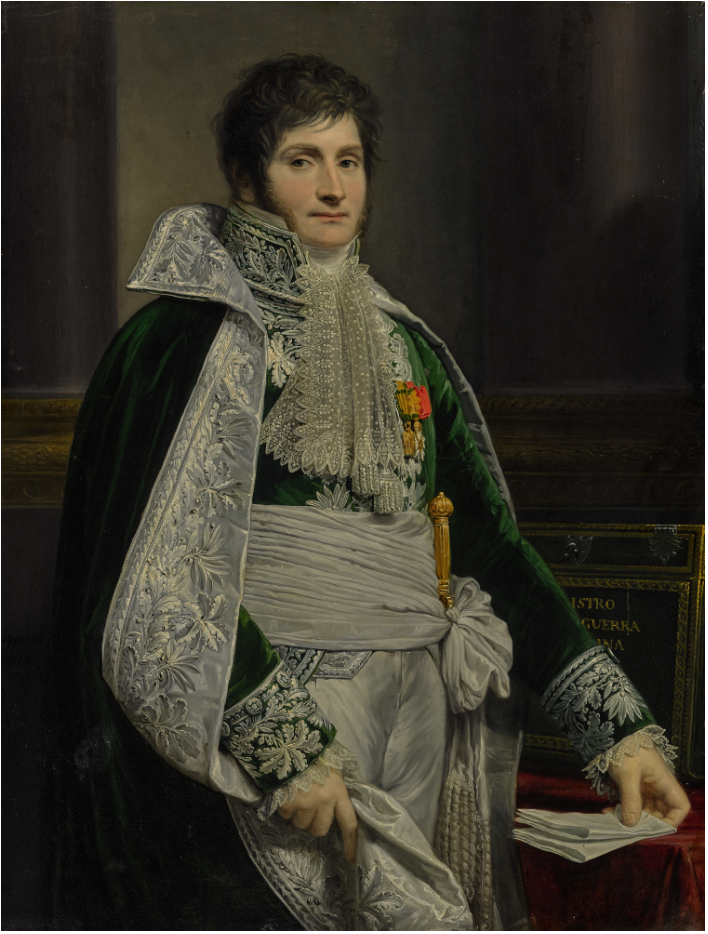
Achille Fontanelli born 8 November

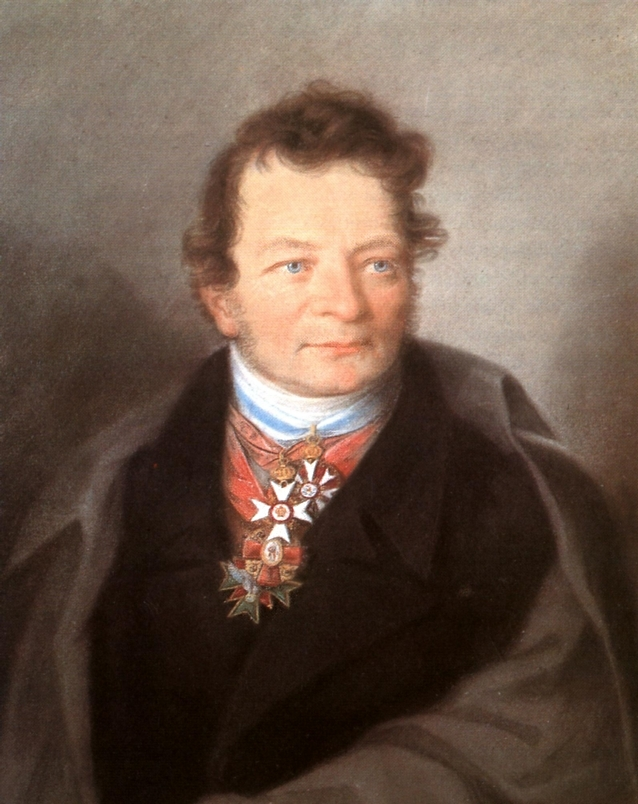
Paul Johann Anselm Ritter von Feuerbach born 14 November

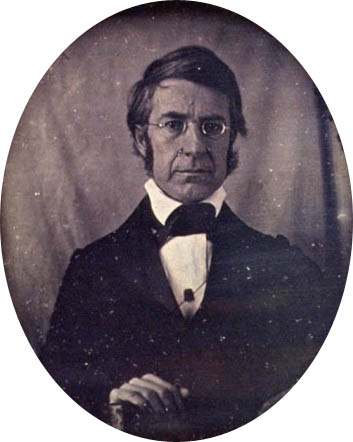
James Carnahan born 15 November

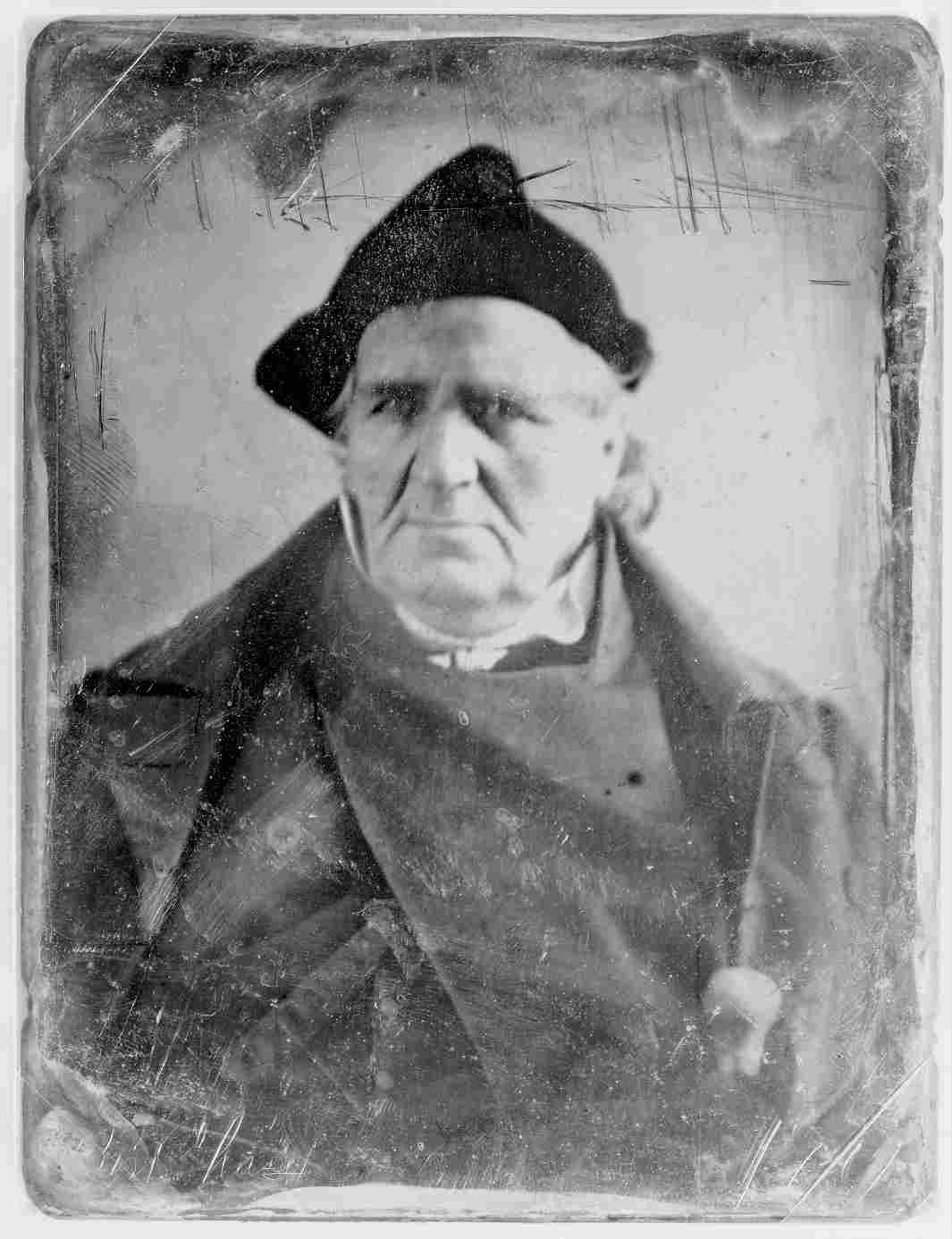
Philander Chase born 14 December

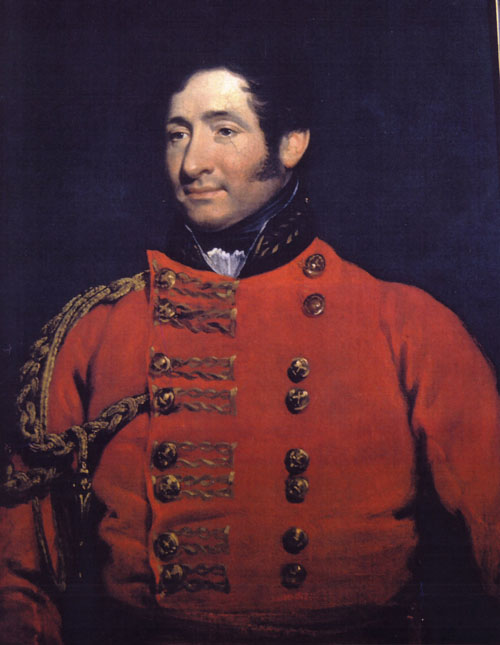
Phineas Riall born 15 December

=== January–March ===
- January 2 – Henry Tufton, 11th Earl of Thanet, English cricketer (d. 1849)
- January 3 – Francis Caulfeild, 2nd Earl of Charlemont, Irish politician (d. 1863)
- January 4
  - George Weare Braikenridge, English antiquarian (d. 1856)
  - Carlo, Duke of Calabria, Italian prince (d. 1778)
- January 6
  - Date Narimura, Japanese daimyō (d. 1796)
  - Horace St Paul, English soldier and Member of Parliament (d. 1840)
- January 7 – Thomas Amyot, English antiquarian (d. 1850)
- January 9
  - Juan Francisco Larrobla, Uruguayan politician (d. 1842)
  - Antonio Villavicencio, statesman and soldier of New Granada (d. 1816)
- January 10 – James Sewall Morsell, United States federal judge (d. 1870)
- January 13 – Stanisław Kostka Zamoyski, Polish noble (d. 1856)
- January 15 – Giosuè Sangiovanni, Italian zoologist (d. 1849)
- January 18
  - Pedro Moreno, Mexican soldier (d. 1817)
  - Evelyn Pierrepont, British Member of Parliament (d. 1801)
- January 19
  - Hudson Gurney, English antiquary and verse-writer (d. 1864)
  - George Pyke, Canadian politician (d. 1851)
- January 20 – André-Marie Ampère, French physicist and mathematician (d. 1836)
- January 22
  - Manuel García, Spanish singer, teacher and composer (d. 1832)
- January 23
  - Pietro Colletta, Neapolitan general and historian (d. 1831)
  - José Fernández Salvador, Ecuadorian politician and jurist (d. 1853)
  - John Rubens Smith, London-born painter (d. 1849)
- January 27 – Friedrich Wilhelm Joseph Schelling, German philosopher (d. 1854)
- January 28
  - Lady Charlotte Bury, English novelist (d. 1861)
  - James Brown Mason, American medical doctor and legislator (d. 1819)
- January 30 – Walter Savage Landor, English writer and poet (d. 1864)
- January 31
  - Giordano Bianchi Dottula, Italian writer and politician (d. 1846)
  - John Richard Farre, English medical doctor (d. 1862)
- February 1
  - Philippe de Girard, French engineer and inventor of the first flax spinning frame in 1810 (d. 1845)
  - Jochum Nicolay Müller, Norwegian naval officer who (d. 1848)
- February 2 – Gurun Princess Hexiao of the Manchu dynasty (d. 1823)
- February 3
  - Maximilien Sébastien Foy, French military leader (d. 1825)
  - Louis-François Lejeune, French general, painter and printmaker (d. 1848)
- February 8
  - Jacob Liv Borch Sverdrup, Norwegian educator (d. 1841)
  - Antonio Bertoloni, Italian botanist who made extensive studies of Italian plants (d. 1869)
  - Thomas Liddell, 1st Baron Ravensworth, British politician (d. 1855)
- February 9
  - Farkas Bolyai, Hungarian mathematician (d. 1856)
  - Theodor Hell, pseudonym of Karl Gottfried Theodor Winkler, German man of letters (d. 1856)
- February 10
  - Charles Lamb, English essayist (d. 1834)
  - James Wilkes Maurice, British Royal Navy officer during the French Revolutionary and Napoleonic Wars (d. 1857)
  - Ádám Récsey, Prime Minister of Hungary (October 3–7, 1848) (d. 1852)
- February 11 – William Hall, American politician (d. 1856)
- February 12 – Charles Lloyd, English poet (d. 1839)
- February 14 – William Clift, English medical illustrator and conservator (d. 1849)
- February 15
  - Paul Allen, American author and editor (d. 1826)
  - Miguel Ramos Arizpe, Mexican priest (d. 1843)
- February 17
  - Heinrich Jacob Aldenrath, German portrait painter (d. 1844)
  - Frederick Garling, English attorney and solicitor (d. 1848)
- February 18 – Thomas Girtin, English painter and etcher (d. 1802)
- February 19
  - John Bibby, founder of the British Bibby Line shipping company (d. 1840)
  - Giovanni Battista Comolli, Italian sculptor (d. 1831)
- February 20
  - Guy-Victor Duperré, French naval officer and Admiral of France (d. 1846)
  - Israel Gregg, first captain of the historic American steamboat Enterprise (1814) (d. 1847)
  - John Starr, merchant and political figure in Nova Scotia (d. 1827)
- February 21
  - Jean-Baptiste Girard, French soldier (d. 1815)
  - Claudius Herrick, American educator and minister (d. 1831)
- February 22
  - William Seymour, United States Representative from New York (d. 1848)
- February 24
  - Claudius Hunter, Lord Mayor of London (d. 1851)
  - Matěj Kopecký, Czech puppeteer (d. 1847)
  - Edward St Maur, 11th Duke of Somerset, English landowner and amateur mathematician (d. 1855)
- February 25 – John Caldwell, businessman and politician in Lower Canada (d. 1842)
- February 26 – Adolf Stieler, German cartographer and lawyer (d. 1836)
- February 28 – Sophie Tieck, German poet (d. 1833)
- March 3 – Henry Prittie, 2nd Baron Dunalley, British politician (d. 1854)
- March 4 – Johann Baptist von Lampi the Younger, Austrian portrait painter (d. 1837)
- March 5
  - Charlotte Richardson, English poet (d. 1825)
  - Adam Elias von Siebold, German gynecologist (d. 1828)
- March 9
  - Jean Kickx, Belgian botanist and mineralogist (d. 1831)
  - Constance Mayer, French painter (d. 1821)
- March 10
  - Marc-Antoine Jullien de Paris, French journalist (d. 1848)
  - Sir David Wedderburn, 1st Baronet, Scottish businessman and politician (d. 1858)
- March 11
  - Nils Landmark, Norwegian politician (d. 1859)
  - Pierre Jean François Turpin, French botanist and illustrator (d. 1840)
- March 12
  - Joseph Chitty, English lawyer and legal writer (d. 1841)
  - Henry Eckford, Scottish-born American shipbuilder, naval architect, industrial engineer, entrepreneur (d. 1832)
  - Michel Grendahl, Norwegian politician (d. 1849)
  - James Welsh, English officer in the Madras Army of the East India Company (d. 1861)
- March 14 – Samuel Street Jr., businessman in Upper Canada (d. 1844)
- March 15 – Juan Bautista Arismendi, Venezuelan patriot and general of the Venezuelan War of Independence (d. 1841)
- March 17 – Ninian Edwards, founding political figure of the state of Illinois (d. 1833)
- March 19 – Ramsay Richard Reinagle, English painter (d. 1862)
- March 22
  - Johan Collett, Norwegian politician and public administrator (d. 1827)
  - Jack Crawford, British Royal Navy sailor, "Hero of Camperdown" (d. 1831)
  - Armand Gouffé, French poet (d. 1845)
- March 23 – William Haseldine Pepys, English physical scientist (d. 1856)
- March 24
  - Pauline Auzou, French painter and art instructor (d. 1835)
  - Pierre Berthezène, French Army general (d. 1847)
  - Muthuswami Dikshitar, South Indian poet and composer (d. 1835)
- March 25 – John Johnston, United States Indian agent (d. 1861)
- March 26 – Thomas Monteagle Bayly, Virginian politician, lawyer and planter (d. 1834)
- March 27 – Nicolai Abraham Holten, Danish civil servant and director of Øresund Custom House (d. 1850)
- March 28 – Johann Heinrich Gossler, Hamburg banker and grand burgher (d. 1842)
- March 30 – Hieronymus Karl Graf von Colloredo-Mansfeld, Austrian corps commander during the Napoleonic Wars (d. 1822)

=== April–June ===
- April 2
  - John Higton, English animal painter (d. 1827)
  - Calvin Jones, American politician (d. 1846)
  - Moses Walton, Virginia farmer serving in both houses of the Virginia General Assembly (d. 1847)
- April 4 – Dutch Sam, British boxer (d. 1816)
- April 5 – Johann Nepomuk Rust, Austrian surgeon (d. 1840)
- April 6 – Edward Wynne-Pendarves, English politician (d. 1853)
- April 7
  - Eliza Jumel, American socialite (d. 1865)
  - Francis Cabot Lowell, American businessman (d. 1817)
  - Louis Barbe Charles Sérurier, French diplomat (d. 1860)
- April 8
  - Antoine Charles Cazenove, Swiss-American businessman and diplomat (d. 1852)
  - Adam Albert von Neipperg, Austrian general and statesman (d. 1829)
  - Thomas Powys, 2nd Baron Lilford, British peer (d. 1825)
- April 9 – Martim Francisco Ribeiro de Andrada, Brazilian politician, leader in Brazil's independence and government (d. 1844)
- April 10 – Carl Wigand Maximilian Jacobi, German psychiatrist (d. 1858)
- April 12
  - Christian Samuel Theodor Bernd, German linguist and heraldist (d. 1854)
  - Vito Nunziante, Italian general (d. 1836)
- April 13 – Adolph Henke, German medical doctor (d. 1843)
- April 14
  - Karl Becker, German philologist (d. 1849)
  - John Philip, Scottish-born missionary in South Africa (d. 1851)
- April 16
  - Sylvester Maxwell, American lawyer and legislator (d. 1858)
  - Charles Stewart, English Anglican bishop in Lower Canada (d. 1837)
- April 21
  - Alexander Anderson, American medical doctor and illustrator (d. 1870)
  - Edward Smith-Stanley, 13th Earl of Derby, British politician (d. 1851)
- April 22
  - Georg Hermes, German Roman Catholic theologian (d. 1831)
  - Henry Ryan, US-Canadian Methodist minister (d. 1833)
- April 23 – J. M. W. Turner, English Romantic landscape painter, watercolourist and printmaker (d. 1851)
- April 25
  - William Warren Baldwin, Canadian politician (d. 1844)
  - Alexander Johnston, Sri Lankan judge (d. 1849)
  - Carlota Joaquina of Spain, Queen consort of Portugal (d. 1830)
- April 27 – Pietro Ostini, Catholic cardinal (d. 1849)
- April 28
  - William Capel, English sportsman and clergyman (d. 1854)
  - Loftus William Otway, British Napoleonic Wars general (d. 1835)
- April 29 – Samuel King, American Presbyterian minister, a founder of the Cumberland Presbyterian Church (d. 1842)
- April 30
  - Guillaume Dode de la Brunerie, Marshal of France (d. 1851)
  - Calvin Fillmore, American farmer and politician from New York (d. 1865)
  - George Kinloch, Scottish reformer and politician (d. 1833)
- May 1 – Angélique Mongez, French Neoclassical artist (d. 1855)
- May 3 – John Hansen Sørbrøden, Norwegian farmer (d. 1857)
- May 5
  - Marie-Anne Calame, Swiss vitreous enamel miniaturist and pietist philanthropic educator (d. 1834)
  - Johann Christoph Friedrich Klug, German entomologist (d. 1856)
  - Alexander McNair, American frontiersman and politician (d. 1826)
  - Pablo Morillo, Spanish general (d. 1837)
- May 6
  - Hans Henrich Maschmann, Norwegian pharmacist (d. 1860)
  - Mary Martha Sherwood, English children's author (d. 1851)
- May 8 – George Gwilt the younger, English architect (d. 1856)
- May 9 – Jacob Brown, United States general (d. 1828)
- May 10
  - Antoine Charles Louis de Lasalle, French cavalry general during the Revolutionary and Napoleonic Wars (d. 1809)
  - William Phillips, English mineralogist and geologist (d. 1828)
- May 12 – George Whitmore, British Army general (d. 1862)
- May 14 – Micah Brooks, United States general (d. 1857)
- May 17
  - Sir John Beckett, 2nd Baronet, British politician (d. 1847)
  - Daniel LeRoy, Attorney General for the Michigan Territory (d. 1858)
- May 19 – Antonín Jan Jungmann, Czech medical doctor (d. 1854)
- May 21 – Lucien Bonaparte, French statesman (d. 1840)
- May 24
  - Sir Charles Ogle, 2nd Baronet, British Royal Navy officer (d. 1858)
  - Matthew Whitworth-Aylmer, 5th Baron Aylmer, British Army general (d. 1850)
- May 25 – Pelagio Palagi, Italian painter (d. 1860)
- May 28 – Thomas Graves, 2nd Baron Graves, British politician (d. 1830)
- May 29 – Nathan Cutler, American politician from Maine (d. 1861)
- May 31
  - Charles Digby, British clergyman, Canon of Windsor from 1808 (d. 1841)
  - Charles Jackson, American lawyer and jurist (d. 1855)
- June 4 – Francesco Molino, Italian guitarist (d. 1847)
- June 8 – Henry Boehm, American clergyman and pastor (d. 1875)
- June 9 – Georg Friedrich Grotefend, German epigraphist and philologist (d. 1853)
- June 10 – James Barbour, American politician (d. 1842)
- June 12
  - Francis Bloodgood, American lawyer, mayor of Albany (d. 1840)
  - Johann Baptist Malfatti von Monteregio, Italian-born medical doctor (d. 1859)
  - Karl Freiherr von Müffling, Prussian Generalfeldmarschall (d. 1851)
- June 13 – Antoni Radziwiłł, Polish politician (d. 1833)
- June 14 – André Bruno de Frévol de Lacoste, French general of the First Empire (d. 1809)
- June 15
  - Elizabeth Benger, English biographer (d. 1827)
  - Paul Delano, American-born sea captain (d. 1842)
  - Carlo Porta, Italian poet (d. 1821)
- June 16 – Judah Touro, American businessman (d. 1854)
- June 17 – Alexander Cowan, Scottish papermaker and philanthropist (d. 1859)
- June 18 – Orsamus Cook Merrill, American politician (d. 1865)
- June 19
  - Vardry McBee, American saddlemaker and philanthropist (d. 1864)
  - Friedrich August Peter von Colomb, German general (d. 1854)
- June 20 – Jacques Frédéric Français, French engineer and mathematician (d. 1833)
- June 22
  - Johannes Flüggé, German botanist and medical doctor (d. 1816)
  - Camillo Ranzani, Italian priest and a naturalist (d. 1841)
- June 24 – John Kempthorne, English clergyman and hymnwriter (d. 1838)
- June 25 – John Stevenson Salt, English barrister, banker and landowner (d. 1845)
- June 26
  - Jean-Jacques Desvaux de Saint-Maurice, French general of the Napoleonic Wars (d. 1815)
  - John Swaine, English draughtsman and engraver (d. 1860)
- June 29 – Thomas Boyle, American privateer (d. 1825)
- June 30 – William Thompson, Irish philosopher (d. 1833)

=== July–September ===
- July 1 – Cephas Thompson, American artist (d. 1856)
- July 2 – Aaron Peasley, American buttonmaker (d. 1837)
- July 3 – Antoine Philippe, Duke of Montpensier, member of the French royal family (d. 1807)
- July 5 – William Crotch, English composer, organist and artist (d. 1847)
- July 8
  - William Davies, United States federal judge (d. 1829)
  - Lucy Mack Smith, American prominent in the Latter Day Saints, mother of Joseph Smith (d. 1856)
- July 9 – Matthew "Monk" Lewis, English Gothic horror writer and politician (d. 1818)
- July 11 – Joseph Blanco White, Spanish-born political thinker, theologian and poet (d. 1841)
- July 14
  - Louis Ducis, French painter (d. 1847)
  - Berkeley Guise, British landowner and Member of Parliament (d. 1834)
- July 15
  - George Schonswar, British politician (d. 1859)
  - Richard Westmacott, British sculptor (d. 1856)
- July 17
  - Domingo Eyzaguirre, Chilean politician and philanthropist (d. 1854)
  - August Harder, German musician (d. 1813)
- July 18
  - Pierre Decouz, French military officer (d. of wounds 1814)
  - Karl von Rotteck, German political activist (d. 1840)
- July 19
  - Camillo Borghese, 6th Prince of Sulmona (d. 1832)
  - John Andrew Shulze, Pennsylvania political leader, sixth Governor of Pennsylvania (d. 1852)
- July 21
  - Edward Heneage, English first-class cricketer (d. 1810)
  - George Osborne, 6th Duke of Leeds, English peer and politician (d. 1838)
- July 23
  - Carl Ludwig Wilhelm Grolman, German jurist (d. 1829)
  - Étienne-Louis Malus, French officer (d. 1812)
- July 24 – Eugène François Vidocq, French criminal and private detective agent (d. 1857)
- July 25 – Anna Harrison, American politician (d. 1864)
- July 27 – Therese Brunsvik, Hungarian educationalist (d. 1861)
- July 28 – Hussey Vivian, 1st Baron Vivian, British Army general (d. 1842)
- July 31 – Emmanuel Dupaty, French singer and writer (d. 1851)
- August 2
  - William Henry Ireland, English forger (d. 1835)
  - José Ángel Lamas, Venezuelan classical musician and composer born in Caracas (d. 1814)
- August 6
  - Louis Antoine, Duke of Angoulême, last Dauphin of France (d. 1844)
  - Daniel O'Connell, Ireland's predominant political leader (d. 1847)
  - Hendrik van Oort, Northern Netherlandish painter (d. 1847)
- August 7
  - Maria Brizzi Giorgi, Italian organist (d. 1812)
  - Jacob Hoel, Norwegian farmer (d. 1847)
  - Henriette Lorimier, popular portraitist in Paris at the beginning of Romanticism (d. 1854)
- August 8 – Richard Blakemore, English politician (d. 1855)
- August 9 – Jacob Brown, United States general (d. 1828)
- August 12 – Conrad Malte-Brun, Danish-born geographer and writer on French politics (d. 1826)
- August 14 – Pieter Adrianus Ossewaarde, Dutch politician (d. 1853)
- August 15
  - Carlos de España, Spanish general (d. 1839)
  - Carl Franz Anton Ritter von Schreibers, Austrian naturalist, native of Pressburg (d. 1852)
- August 16
  - John Carlyle Herbert, American politician (d. 1846)
  - Ebenezer Sage, American politician (d. 1834)
- August 18
  - James Elliot, American politician (d. 1839)
  - Johann Leonhard Pfaff, bishop of the German Roman Catholic Diocese of Fulda from 1832 (d. 1848)
- August 20
  - Franz Dinnendahl, German mechanical engineer (d. 1826)
  - George Tucker, American politician (d. 1861)
- August 22
  - François Péron, French naturalist and explorer (d. 1810)
  - August von Vécsey, Austro-Hungarian general (d. 1857)
- August 23 – Mark Cubbon, British army officer with the East India Company (d. 1861)
- August 25 – Karl Joseph Hieronymus Windischmann, German philosopher and anthropologist (d. 1839)
- August 26 – William Joseph Behr, German political radical (d. 1851)
- August 27
  - Frederick Graff, American hydraulic engineer (d. 1847)
  - Jan Verveer, major general of the Royal Netherlands Army (d. 1838)
- August 28
  - Antoine Marc Augustin Bertoletti, Italian general (d. 1846)
  - Sophie Gail, French singer and composer (d. 1819)
- August 29 – Niels Wulfsberg, Norwegian publisher (d. 1852)
- August 31
  - Agnes Bulmer, English epic poet (d. 1836)
  - François de Fossa, French classical guitarist and composer (d. 1849)
- September 1 – Honoré Charles Reille, French general, Marshal of France (d. 1860)
- September 4 – Jean-François Le Gonidec, Breton linguist, Bible translator (d. 1838)
- September 5
  - Juan Martín Díez, El Empecinado, Spanish military leader (d. 1825)
  - Adolph Ferdinand Gehlen, German chemist (d. 1815)
- September 6 – Aleksey Greig, Russian admiral (d. 1845)
- September 7 – John Jebb, Irish Anglican bishop and religious writer (d. 1833)
- September 8
  - John Leyden, Scottish orientalist (d. 1811)
  - Vasily Orlov-Denisov, Cossack Russian general (d. 1843)
- September 9
  - Guillaume Capelle, French administrator and politician (d. 1843)
  - Francisco Ramón Vicuña, President of Chile (d. 1849)
- September 10
  - John Kidd, English medical doctor, chemist and geologist (d. 1851)
  - Murray Maxwell, British Royal Navy officer (d. 1831)
- September 11
  - Narciso Fernández de Heredia, 2nd Count of Heredia-Spínola, Prime Minister of Spain (d. 1847)
  - Ferdinand August Freiherr von Hügel, general in the royal Württemberg Infantry (d. 1834)
- September 12 – Josef Jüttner, Austrian cartographer and military officer (d. 1848)
- September 13 – Laura Secord, Canadian heroine of the War of 1812 (d. 1868)
- September 14
  - Jean-Louis Burnouf, French philologist and translator (d. 1844)
  - John Henry Hobart, third Episcopal bishop of New York from 1816 (d. 1830)
  - Joseph Phillimore, English lawyer and Member of Parliament (d. 1855)
- September 15 – William A. Griswold, American lawyer and politician (d. 1846)
- September 16
  - Hermano José Braamcamp de Almeida Castelo Branco, Portuguese nobleman and politician (d. 1846)
  - Giuseppe Rosaroll, Italian essayist and general in the army of the Kingdom of the Two Sicilies (d. 1825)
  - Christian Friedrich Schwägrichen, German botanist specializing in the field of bryology (d. 1853)
- September 17
  - Georges Roffavier, French botanist (d. 1866)
  - Margrethe Schall, Danish ballerina (d. 1852)
- September 19 – José Félix Ribas, hero of the Venezuelan War of Independence (d. 1815)
- September 20 – François-Pierre Chaumeton, French botanist and medical doctor (d. 1819)
- September 22 – Philip Milledoler, American protestant minister and fifth President of Rutgers College (d. 1852)
- September 23 – Jens Christian Berg, Norwegian lawyer and historian (d. 1852)
- September 24 – Nathan Heald, officer in the United States Army during the War of 1812 (d. 1832)
- September 25 – Pierre Flor, Norwegian politician (d. 1848)
- September 26 – James Grimston, 1st Earl of Verulam, British peer and Member of Parliament (d. 1845)
- September 29
  - David McConaughy, American pastor and fourth president of Washington College from 1831 to 1852 (d. 1852)
  - François Michel de Rozière, French mining engineer and mineralogist (d. 1842)
  - Herbert Taylor, British Army officer (d. 1839)
- September 30 – Robert Adrain, Irish-born American mathematician (d. 1843)

=== October–December ===
- October 2 – Cornelius O'Callaghan, 1st Viscount Lismore, Irish politician (d. 1857)
- October 3 – Isaac von Sinclair, German writer and diplomat (d. 1815)
- October 6 – Johann Anton André, German composer and music publisher (d. 1842)
- October 7
  - Ramón Power y Giralt, Puerto Rican politician and Spanish admiral (d. 1813)
  - Jaygopal Tarkalankar, Bengali writer and Sanskrit scholar (d. 1846)
- October 9
  - Sir Alexander Boswell, 1st Baronet, British politician (d. 1822)
  - Lars Johannes Irgens, Norwegian jurist and public official (d. 1830)
  - Peter Thonning, Danish medical doctor and botanist (d. 1848)
  - Charles Williams-Wynn, British politician (d. 1850)
- October 12
  - Lyman Beecher, American Presbyterian minister and patriarch (d. 1863)
  - Ludovico Micara, Italian Catholic cardinal (d. 1847)
- October 13 – John Wentworth Loring, British Royal Navy admiral (d. 1852)
- October 14 – Godfrey Macdonald, 3rd Baron Macdonald of Sleat, Scottish general (d. 1832)
- October 15
  - Bernhard Crusell, Swedish-Finnish clarinetist and composer 1838)
  - Alberto Lista, Spanish poet and educationalist (d. 1848)
  - Bernardo Peres da Silva, governor of Portuguese India (d. 1844)
- October 17 – Ole Paulssøn Haagenstad, Norwegian politician (d. 1866)
- October 18
  - Martial Aubertin, French stage actor and dramatist (d. 1824)
  - Dawson Turner, English banker and botanist (d. 1858)
  - John Vanderlyn, American artist (d. 1852)
- October 19
  - Jean-Baptiste Faribault, Lower Canadian trader with the Indians and early settler in Minnesota (d. 1860)
  - Kamma Rahbek, Danish salon holder (d. 1829)
- October 21
  - Giuseppe Baini, Italian priest, music critic and composer (d. 1844)
  - Bartholomew Crannell Beardsley, Canadian politician, lawyer and judge (d. 1855)
- October 23 – Gottlob Friedrich Thormeyer, German architect (d. 1842)
- October 24 – Bahadur Shah II, Mughal emperor (d. 1862)
- October 26
  - Charles Douglas, 3rd Baron Douglas, English amateur cricketer (d. 1848)
  - Hans Moritz Hauke, German-Polish general (d. 1830)
  - Joseph Nightingale, prolific English writer and preacher (d. 1824)
  - Alexander Thom, Scottish military surgeon, judge and politician in Upper Canada (d. 1845)
- October 30
  - Catterino Cavos, Russian composer (d. 1840)
  - Wilhelm Ludwig Viktor Henckel von Donnersmarck, Prussian officer who fought in the Napoleonic Wars (d. 1849)
- November 1 – Christian Adolph Diriks, Norwegian lawyer and statesman (d. 1837)
- November 2
  - Jean-Emmanuel Jobez, French businessman and politician (d. 1828)
  - Jeromus Johnson, American politician (d. 1846)
- November 3 – Edward Paget, British Army general (d. 1849)
- November 4 – Pierre Capelle, French chansonnier (d. 1851)
- November 6 – August Wilhelm Hartmann, Danish composer (d. 1850)
- November 7 – Joseph Fox, English dental surgeon (d. 1816)
- November 8
  - Achille Fontanelli, Italian nationalist and Napoleonic general (d. 1838)
  - Jacob Peter Mynster, Danish theologian and Bishop of Zealand (d. 1854)
- November 9 – Daniel Waldron, American businessman (d. 1821)
- November 10 – James Elliot, American politician (d. 1839)
- November 11 – Gulbrand Eriksen Tandberg, Norwegian farmer and politician (d. 1848)
- November 13
  - John Burns, Scottish surgeon (d. 1850)
  - Richard Butler, 1st Earl of Glengall, Irish peer (d. 1819)
  - Rémi Joseph Isidore Exelmans, distinguished French soldier of the Revolutionary and Napoleonic Wars (d. 1852)
- November 14 – Paul Johann Anselm Ritter von Feuerbach, German legal scholar (d. 1833)
- November 15 – James Carnahan, American clergyman and educator, ninth President of Princeton University (d. 1859)
- November 19
  - Johann Karl Wilhelm Illiger, German entomologist and zoologist (d. 1813)
  - François Antoine Teste, French officer during the Napoleonic Wars (d. 1862)
- November 20 – Gustav Anton von Seckendorff, German author (d. 1823)
- November 21 – Josef Servas d'Outrepont, German obstetrician (d. 1845)
- November 23
  - Clemens Wenzeslaus Coudray, German neoclassical architect (d. 1845)
  - Johann Georg Rist, Danish author (d. 1847)
  - Maria Anna of Naples and Sicily, member of the French Royal Family (d. 1780)
- November 24 – Peter Buell Allen, politician and military commander in New York State, pioneer of Vigo County and Terre Haute (d. 1833)
- November 25
  - Joseph Borremans, Belgian composer (d. 1858)
  - Michel Étienne Descourtilz, French medical doctor, botanist and historiographer of the Haitian revolution (d. 1835)
  - Jean Baptiste Godart, French entomologist (d. 1825)
  - Gustaf Gabriel Hällström, Finnish scientist (d. 1844)
  - Charles Kemble, Welsh-born English actor of a prominent theatre family (d. 1854)
- November 27
  - Jean-Françoìs de Dompierre de Jonquières, Dutch-Danish merchant (d. 1820)
  - Lauritz Weidemann, Norwegian politician (d. 1856)
- November 28
  - William Frere, English lawyer and academic (d. 1836)
  - Jean-Charles Létourneau, notary and political figure in Lower Canada (d. 1838)
- November 29 – Marie Antoine de Reiset, French general during the French Revolutionary Wars and the Napoleonic Wars (d. 1836)
- November 30 – Jean Joseph Antoine de Courvoisier, French magistrate and politician (d. 1835)
- December 2 – Joseph Denis Odevaere, Neo-Classical painter from the Southern Netherlands (modern-day Belgium) (d. 1830)
- December 5 – Abijah Bigelow, American politician (d. 1860)
- December 6
  - Sir Charles Blunt, 4th Baronet, British Member of Parliament (d. 1840)
  - Nicolas Isouard, Maltese composer (d. 1818)
- December 10
  - José María de la Cueva, 14th Duke of Albuquerque, Spanish general and ambassador (d. 1811)
  - Giacomo Filippo Fransoni, Catholic cardinal (d. 1856)
  - Jacques-Antoine Manuel, French lawyer (d. 1827)
- December 11 – Peter Little, American politician (d. 1830)
- December 13 – Theodor Gottlieb von Hippel the Younger, Prussian statesman (d. 1843)
- December 14
  - Philander Chase, American Episcopal Church bishop, educator and pioneer (d. 1852)
  - Thomas Cochrane, 10th Earl of Dundonald, British Royal Navy admiral (d. 1860)
- December 15 – Phineas Riall, British Army general (d. 1850)
- December 16
  - Ciro Annunchiarico, Italian cult leader (d. 1817)
  - Jane Austen, English novelist (d. 1817)
  - François-Adrien Boïeldieu, French composer (d. 1834)
  - John Fullerton, Lord Fullerton, Scottish judge (d. 1853)
- December 17 – Carlo Rossi, Russian architect (d. 1849)
- December 20
  - Samuel Farrow, American politician (d. 1824)
  - Pierre Antoine François Huber, brigadier general in the French army (d. 1832)
- December 21 – Julien-Joseph Virey, French naturalist and anthropologist (d. 1846)
- December 25
  - John Fitzgerald, British Member of Parliament (d. 1852)
  - Peter Reesor, American-born Mennonite settler in Ontario (d. 1854)
  - Antun Sorkočević, Croatian composer, writer and diplomat (d. 1841)
- December 26 – Anton Carl Ludwig von Tabouillot, French officer, nobleman and counter-revolutionary (d. 1813)
- December 28
  - João Domingos Bomtempo, Portuguese musician (d. 1842)
  - Jean-Gabriel Eynard, Swiss banker (d. 1863)
  - Pierre François Étienne Bouvet de Maisonneuve, French admiral (d. 1860)
- Date unknown – Jeanne Geneviève Garnerin, French balloonist and parachutist (d. 1847)

1776

- January 1 – James M. Broom, American politician (d. 1850)
- January 2 – Jeremiah Chaplin, American Reformed Baptist theologian (d. 1841)
- January 3 – Thomas Morris, American politician (d. 1844)
- January 4
  - Bernardino Drovetti, Italian diplomat (d. 1852)
  - Jean-Baptiste Prosper Jollois, French Egyptologist (d. 1842)
- January 6
  - Ferdinand von Schill, German noble (d. 1809)
  - Auguste Jean Ameil, French soldier (d. 1822)
- January 8 – Thomas Langlois Lefroy, Irish politician (d. 1869)
- January 9 – Ludwig Rhesa, Prussian scholar (d. 1840)
- January 10 – George Birkbeck, English doctor, academic and philanthropist (d. 1841)
- January 15 – Prince William Frederick, Duke of Gloucester and Edinburgh, Roman-born British prince (d. 1834)
- January 16
  - Matthew Brown, American college president (d. 1853)
  - João Soares de Albergaria de Sousa, Portuguese politician (d. 1875)
  - Richard Onslow, English archdeacon (d. 1849)
- January 17 (bapt.) – Jane Porter, English novelist (d. 1850)
- January 21
  - Poul Christian Holst, Norwegian politician (d. 1863)
  - Elisha Haley, American politician (d. 1860)
- January 23 – Howard Douglas, British Army general (d. 1861)
- January 24
  - Jean-Guillaume, baron Hyde de Neuville, French aristocrat (d. 1857)
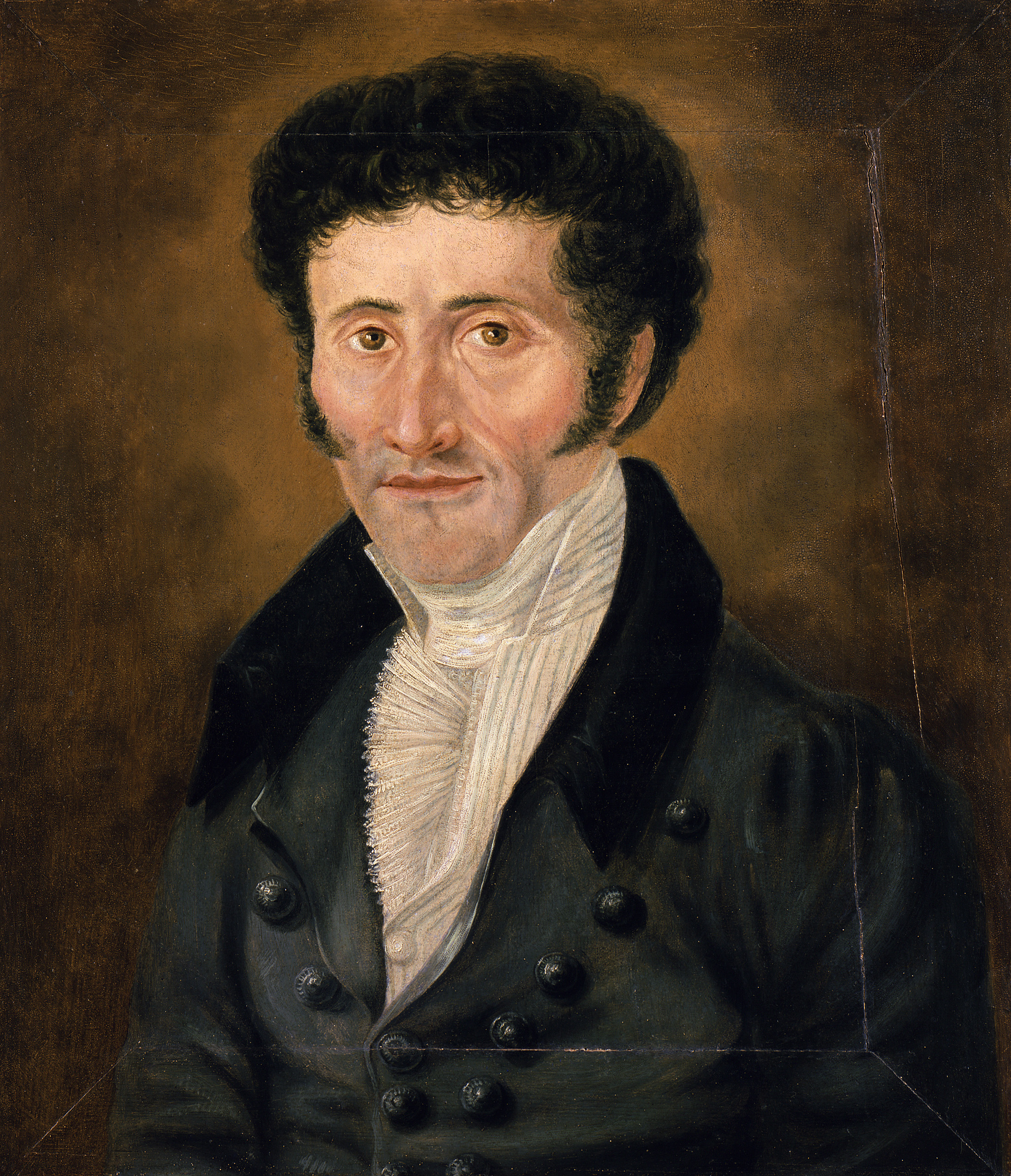
    E. T. A. Hoffmann
  - E. T. A. Hoffmann, German writer, composer and painter (d. 1822)
  - Peter A. Jay, American politician (d. 1843)
- January 25 – Joseph Görres, German writer and journalist (d. 1848)
- January 29 – William Bowie, American agrarian (d. 1826)
- February 4
  - Gottfried Reinhold Treviranus, German biologist (d. 1837)
  - Jan Gerard Kemmerling, Dutch mayor (d. 1818)
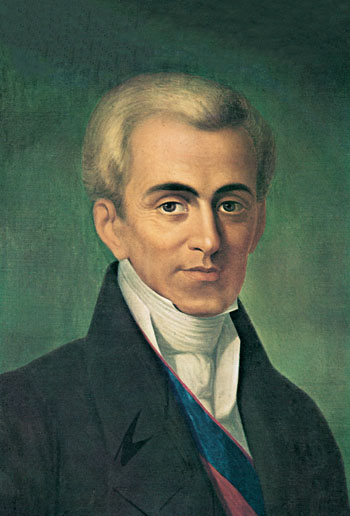
    Ioannis Kapodistrias
- February 11 – Ioannis Kapodistrias, Governor of Greece (d. 1831)
- February 12
  - Richard Mant, Irish bishop (d. 1848)
  - Mary Young Pickersgill, American maker of the Star Spangled Banner flag (d. 1857)
- February 14 – Christian Gottfried Daniel Nees von Esenbeck, prolific German botanist (d. 1858)
- February 15 – Jean-Pierre Boyer, President of Haiti (d. 1850)
- February 16 – Abraham Raimbach, British engraver (d. 1843)
- February 17
  - Ross Cuthbert, Canadian politician (d. 1861)
  - Georg zu Münster, German paleontologist (d. 1844)
- February 18 – Karl August Ferdinand von Borcke, German general (d. 1830)
- February 20 – Mariano Ricafort Palacín y Abarca, Spanish colonial governor of Cuba (d. 1846)
- February 21 – Joseph Barss, Canadian privateer, sea captain (d. 1824)
- February 23
  - John Walter, English newspaper editor (d. 1847)
  - Heneage Horsley, Scottish priest (d. 1847)
- February 25 – George William Tighe, English expatriate (d. 1837)
- February 26
  - Innis Green, American congressman for Pennsylvania (d. 1839)
  - John Paterson, Scottish missionary to Northern Europe (d. 1855)
- February 28 – François Quirouet, Canadian politician (d. 1844)
- March 1
  - John Collins, American manufacturer, politician (d. 1822)
  - Elias Moore (d. 1847)
- March 3 – James Parker, American politician (d. 1868)
- March 4 – Guillaume Emmanuel Guignard, vicomte de Saint-Priest, Russian army commander (d. 1814)
- March 5 – Gerard Troost, American mineralogist (d. 1850)
- March 6 – Luigi Lambruschini, Italian Catholic cardinal (d. 1854)
- March 7 – Timothy Ruggles, Canadian politician (d. 1831)
- March 8
  - David Rogerson Williams, American politician (d. 1830)
  - Samuel Tweedy, American politician (d. 1868)
- March 9
  - Thomas Evans, British Army general (d. 1863)
  - Archduke Joseph, Palatine of Hungary, Archduke of Austria (d. 1847)
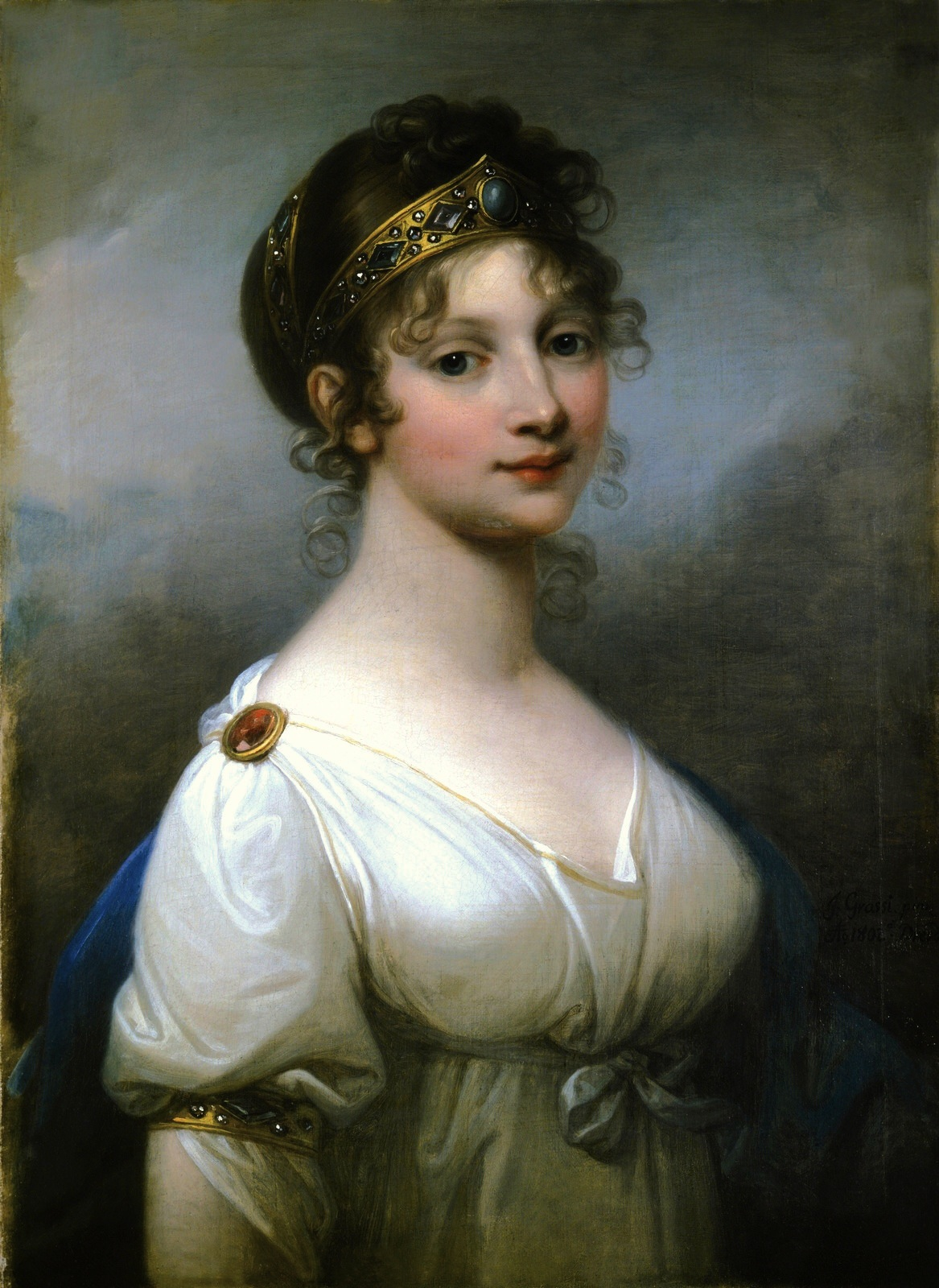
    Louise of Mecklenburg-Strelitz
- March 10
  - Louise of Mecklenburg-Strelitz, Queen of Prussia (d. 1810)
  - Étienne Ranvoyzé, Canadian politician (d. 1826)
- March 12 – Lady Hester Stanhope, English archaeologist (d. 1839)
- March 16 – Johan Gijsbert Verstolk van Soelen, Dutch Minister of Foreign Affairs (d. 1845)
- March 15 – Aimé Picquet du Boisguy, French chouan general during the French Revolution (d. 1839)
- March 17 – Joel Abbot, American politician (d. 1826)
- March 19 – Philemon Beecher, American politician (d. 1839)
- March 20
  - Joshua Bates, American educator (d. 1854)
  - Richard Temple-Nugent-Brydges-Chandos-Grenville, 1st Duke of Buckingham and Chandos, English politician (d. 1839)
- March 21 – John Frederick Frelinghuysen, United States general (d. 1833)
- March 23
  - Robert Eden Duncombe Shafto, English politician (d. 1848)
  - Vicente Salias, Venezuelan doctor (d. 1814)
- March 24 – Zusho Hirosato, Japanese samurai (d. 1849)
- March 27 – Charles-François Brisseau de Mirbel, French botanist, politician (d. 1854)
- March 30 – Vasily Tropinin, Russian artist (d. 1857)
- March 31 – Joseph Küffner, German musician, composer (d. 1856)
- April 1
  - Pierre François Bellot, Swiss jurist (d. 1836)
  - Sophie Germain, French mathematician (d. 1831)
- April 3
  - François Blanchet, Canadian physician, politician (d. 1830)
  - Mary Anne Clarke, English mistress of Prince Frederick (d. 1852)
- April 6 – Jesse Bledsoe, American politician (d. 1836)
- April 11
  - Macvey Napier, Scottish legal scholar, one of the editors of the Encyclopædia Britannica (d. 1847)
  - Jerome Inglott, Maltese philosopher (d. 1835)
- April 12
  - Henry Hezekiah Cogswell, Canadian politician (d. 1854)
  - Henry Hobhouse, English archivist (d. 1854)
- April 13 – Wilhelm von Schütz, German author, playwright (d. 1847)
- April 15 – John Anstruther-Thomson, Scottish nobleman, Colonel of the Royal Fifeshire Yeomanry Cavalry (d. 1833)
- April 17 – Jean-François Roger, French poet, politician (d. 1842)
- April 20
  - Augustin-Marie d'Aboville, French artillerist during the Revolution (d. 1843)
  - William Weston Young, English Quaker businessman (d. 1847)
- April 25
  - James Miller, American politician (d. 1851)
  - Edward Solly, English merchant, art collector (d. 1844)
  - Princess Mary, Duchess of Gloucester and Edinburgh, member of the British Royal Family (d. 1857)
- April 27
  - Hyacinthe Jadin, French composer (d. 1800)
  - John Cunningham, Canadian politician (d. 1847)
- April 28
  - Charles Bennet, 5th Earl of Tankerville, English politician (d. 1859)
  - Manuel Vieira de Albuquerque Touvar, Portuguese nobleman (d. 1833)
- May 4 – Johann Friedrich Herbart, German philosopher, psychologist (d. 1841)
- May 5 – Valentine Efner, American politician (d. 1865)
- May 6
  - Stephen Rumbold Lushington, English politician, administrator in Madras (d. 1868)
  - Pyotr Mikhailovich Volkonsky, Russian field marshal (d. 1852)
  - Rensselaer Westerlo, American politician (d. 1851)
- May 8
  - Edward Leveson-Gower, British Royal Navy admiral (d. 1853)
  - Prince Bagrat of Georgia (d. 1841)
- May 9 – Thomas Maguire, Canadian Catholic priest (d. 1854)
- May 10 – George Thomas Smart, English musician (d. 1867)
- May 12 – José de La Mar, military leader, President of Peru (d. 1830)
- May 13 – Jett Thomas, American militia general (d. 1817)
- May 17 – Amos Eaton, American botanist (d. 1842)
- May 18 – Dennis Pennington, American politician (d. 1854)
- May 20
  - Simon Fraser, Canadian explorer (d. 1862)
  - Víctor Rosales, Mexican rebel (d. 1817)
- May 29 – Peter Erasmus Müller, Danish historian, linguist and theologian (d. 1834)
- May 31 – José Antonio de la Garza, American mayor (d. 1851)
- June 1
  - George Schetky, American conductor (d. 1831)
  - Giuseppe Zamboni, Italian Catholic priest, physicist (d. 1846)
- June 4 – Isaac B. Van Houten, American politician (d. 1850)
- June 6 – William Reed, American politician (d. 1837)
- June 8 – Thomas Rickman, English architect, architectural antiquary (d. 1841)
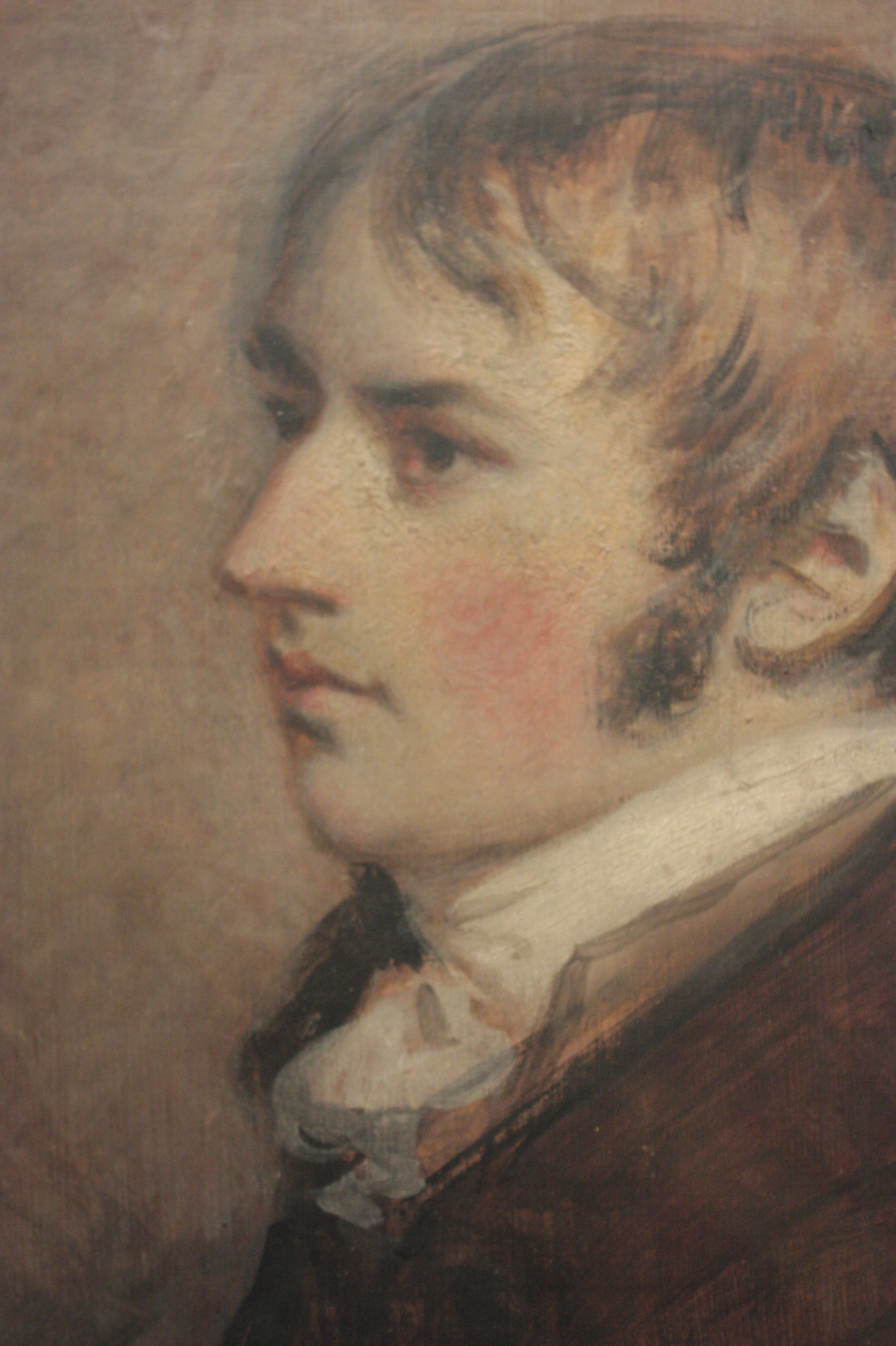
  John Constable
- June 11 – John Constable, English landscape painter (d. 1837)
- June 12
  - Karl Friedrich Burdach, German physiologist (d. 1847)
  - José Manuel de Goyeneche, 1st Count of Guaqui, Spanish soldier, diplomat (d. 1846)
  - Pierre Révoil, French painter (d. 1842)
- June 19 – Francis Johnson, American politician (d. 1842)
- June 21
  - Landgravine Josepha of Fürstenberg-Weitra, Princess of Liechtenstein (d. 1848)
  - Charles Horsfall, English merchant, politician (d. 1846)
  - William Wadd, English surgeon, medical author (d. 1829)
- June 23 – Stephen Longfellow, American politician (d. 1849)
- June 28 – Charles Mathews, English actor (d. 1835)
- June 29 – George Okill Stuart, Canadian clergyman (d. 1862)
- July 1
  - Samuel Thatcher, American politician (d. 1872)
  - Sophie Gay, French author (d. 1852)
- July 3 – Henry Parnell, 1st Baron Congleton, Anglo-Irish politician (d. 1842)
- July 4
  - Pär Aron Borg, Swedish sign language creator (d. 1839)
  - Ethan Allen Brown, American politician (d. 1852)
- July 5
  - Daniel Dobbins, captain in the United States Revenue Cutter Service (d. 1856)
  - Bernard Smith, American politician (d. 1835)
- July 10 – Samuel Powell, American politician (d. 1841)
- July 11 – William Bradbery, English entrepreneur (d. 1860)
- July 12 – John Christian, Manx judge (d. 1852)
- July 13 – Caroline of Baden, Queen of Bavaria (d. 1841)
- July 14 – Pierre Yrieix Daumesnil, French soldier (d. 1832)
- July 16
  - Ludwig Heinrich Bojanus, German physician, naturalist (d. 1827)
  - Johann Georg von Soldner, German physicist (d. 1833)
- July 17 – John Neilson, Canadian politician (d. 1848)
- July 18 – John Struthers, Scottish poet (d. 1853)
- July 20 – Ignaz Schuppanzigh, Austrian musician (d. 1830)
- July 22
  - Etheldred Benett, English geologist (d. 1845)
  - Friedrich Hermann Otto, Prince of Hohenzollern-Hechingen (d. 1838)
- July 26 – Pierre Fouquier, French physician, professor of medicine (d. 1850)
- July 29 – James McSherry, American politician (d. 1849)
- July 30 – Sir Edward Kerrison, 1st Baronet, British general (d. 1853)
- August 1
  - Archibald Acheson, 2nd Earl of Gosford, Governor General of British North America (1835–1837) (d. 1849)
  - Jean Corbineau, French cavalry general (d. 1848)
- August 2
  - Thomas Assheton Smith II, English cricketer (d. 1858)
  - Friedrich Stromeyer, German chemist (d. 1835)
- August 4 – Pierre-Simon Ballanche, French writer and counterrevolutionary philosopher (d. 1847)
- August 5
  - Sophie d'Artois, French princess (d. 1783)
  - John Willson, Canadian judge (d. 1860)
- August 6 – William Crooks, Canadian politician (d. 1836)
- August 9
  - Jacob Munch, Norwegian painter, military officer (d. 1839)
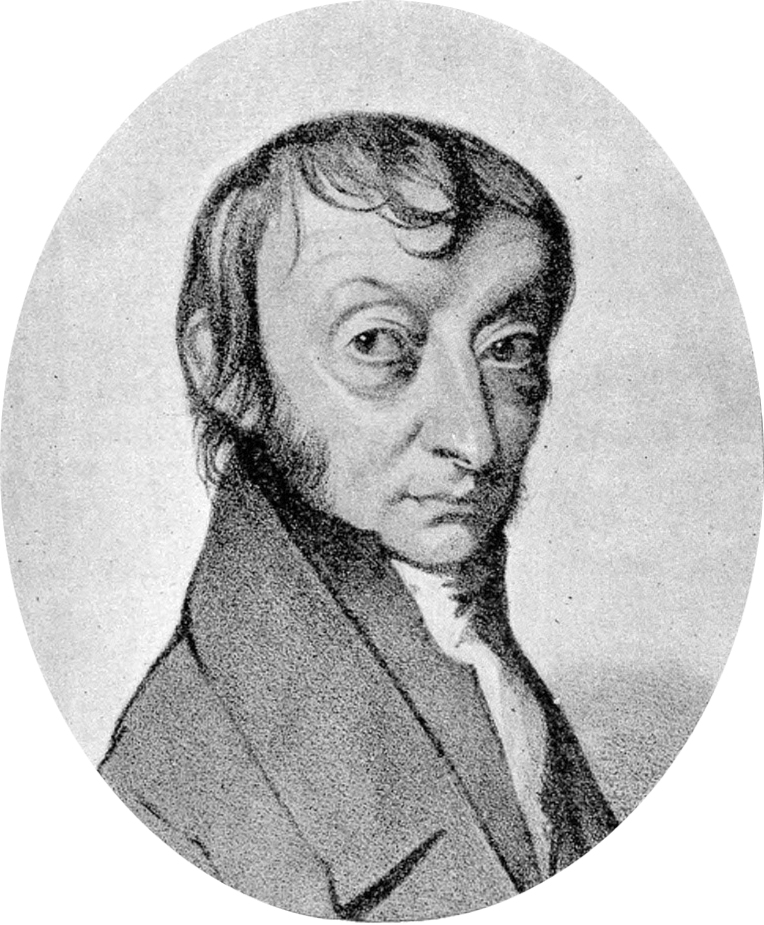
    Amedeo Avogadro
  - Amedeo Avogadro, Italian chemist (d. 1856)
- August 12
  - Thomas Millidge, Jr., New Brunswick businessman, political figure (d. 1838)
  - David Erskine, 2nd Baron Erskine, British politician (d. 1855)
- August 13 – Abraham Shepherd, American politician (d. 1847)
- August 14
  - Prince Christian of Hesse (d. 1814)
  - Christian Friedrich Tieck, German sculptor (d. 1851)
- August 15
  - Ignaz von Seyfried, Austrian musician (d. 1841)
  - Gottlieb Schick, German artist (d. 1812)
- August 16
  - Amalia von Helvig, German and Swedish artist (d. 1831)
  - Philipp Jakob Riotte, German composer (d. 1856)
  - Monaldo Leopardi, Italian philosopher (d. 1847)
  - Jean-Roch Coignet, French soldier (d. 1865)
- August 18
  - Agustín Argüelles, Spanish liberal politician (d. 1844)
  - Thomas Howard, 16th Earl of Suffolk, England (d. 1851)
  - Sir Robert Newman, 1st Baronet, English politician (d. 1848)
- August 21
  - Joseph Healy, American politician (d. 1861)
  - Elizabeth Parke Custis Law, American matriarch (d. 1832)
- August 22 – Carlo Amati, Italian architect (d. 1852)
- August 23
  - Jens Peter Debes, Norwegian politician (d. 1832)
  - Józef Maria Hoene-Wroński, Polish philosopher (d. 1853)
- August 25 – Thomas Bladen Capel, British admiral (d. 1853)
- August 26
  - Ferdynand Stokowski, Polish general (d. 1827)
  - Henry A. Livingston, American politician (d. 1849)
- August 27 – Barthold Georg Niebuhr, Danish-German statesman, historian (d. 1831)
- August 29 – Georg Friedrich Treitschke, German librettist (d. 1842)
- September 1
  - Jacques Gervais, baron Subervie, French general, politician (d. 1856)
  - Ezekiel Bacon, American politician (d. 1870)
- September 3 – Étienne Mayrand, Canadian politician (d. 1872)
- September 4 – Stephen Whitney, American merchant (d. 1860)
- September 5 – Augustus Simon Frazer, French-born British Army officer (d. 1835)
- September 8
  - Amelia of Nassau-Weilburg, German noblewoman (d. 1841)
  - Heinrich Meldahl, Norwegian builder (d. 1840)
- September 9
  - Parmenio Adams, American politician (d. 1832)
  - Calvin Pease, Ohio jurist, legislator (d. 1839)
  - Philip Broke, British Royal Navy admiral (d. 1841)
- September 11 – Thomas Arbuthnot, British Army general (d. 1849)
- September 15
  - William Baylies, American politician (d. 1865)
  - Calvin Willey, American politician (d. 1858)
- September 17 – Langdon Cheves, American politician (d. 1857)
- September 18 – Thomas Gleadowe-Newcomen, 2nd Viscount Newcomen, English politician (d. 1825)
- September 21
  - Karl Gustav Bonuvier, Swedish actor, theatre director (d. 1858)
  - John Fitchett, English poet (d. 1838)
- September 27
  - Peter Shaver, Canadian politician (d. 1866)
  - Maria Versfelt, Dutch writer, actor (d. 1845)
- October 1 – Augustus Warren Baldwin, Upper Canada naval officer, political figure (d. 1866)
- October 3 – Thomas Walsh, Vicar Apostolic of England and Wales (d. 1849)
- October 4
  - Giovanni Battista Bellé, Italian Bishop of Mantova (d. 1844)
  - Antonio Tosti, Italian cardinal-priest (d. 1866)
  - Mariano Lagasca, Spanish botanist (d. 1839)
- October 6
  - Hirata Atsutane, Japanese theologian of the Shintō religion (d. 1843)
  - James Duff, 4th Earl Fife, Scottish-born Spanish general (d. 1857)
  - James Stuart-Wortley, 1st Baron Wharncliffe, English politician (d. 1845)
- October 8 – Pieter van Os, Dutch painter, engraver (d. 1839)
- October 12 – Jean-Michel Mahé, French Navy officer, captain (d. 1833)
- October 13
  - Peter Barlow, English mathematician (d. 1862)
  - John Gibb, Scottish civil engineering contractor (d. 1850)
- October 14
  - Samuel Rexford, New York politician (d. 1857)
  - Robert Townsend Farquhar, British colonial administrator (d. 1830)
- October 18 – Cowles Mead, American politician (d. 1844)
- October 20 – John Rolls of The Hendre, British judge (d. 1837)
- October 21 – George Izard, United States general (d. 1828)
- October 22 – Edward Draper, British military officer, civil servant in Mauritius (d. 1841)
- October 25 – Patrick Neill, Scottish printer, horticulturalist (d. 1851)
- October 28 – Joachim Haspinger, Catholic priest, leader of the Tyrolese revolt against Napoleon (d. 1858)
- October 30
  - George M. Bibb, American politician (d. 1859)
  - John Hahn, American politician (d. 1823)
- October 31 – Francis Locke Jr., American politician (d. 1823)
- November 1 – Abraham McClellan, American politician (d. 1851)
- November 5 – Abraham Teerlink, Dutch painter (d. 1857)
- November 7
  - Bartow White, American politician (d. 1862)
  - James Abercromby, 1st Baron Dunfermline, British politician (d. 1858)
- November 10
  - Samuel Gross, American politician (d. 1839)
  - Henry Seymour (Knoyle), British politician (d. 1849)
  - General Washington Johnston, American politician (d. 1833)
- November 11 – Philip E. Thomas, American banker, railroad executive (d. 1861)
- November 14 – Henri Dutrochet, French physician (d. 1847)
- November 15
  - Aaron Manby, English civil engineer, founder of the Horseley Ironworks (d. 1850)
  - Pehr Henrik Ling, Swedish physical therapist (d. 1839)
- November 17
  - Friedrich Christoph Schlosser, German historian (d. 1861)
  - Robert Trimble, Associate Justice of the Supreme Court of the United States (d. 1828)
- November 20
  - William Blackwood, Scottish publisher (d. 1834)
  - Maximilian Seyssel d'Aix, German general (d. 1855)
- November 24
  - Jean-Joseph Marcel, French printer and engineer (d. 1854)
  - Matthew John Tierney, Irish surgeon (d. 1845)
- November 29 – Harcourt Lees, Irish clergyman, political pamphleteer (d. 1852)
- November 30
  - Philippe André de Vilmorin, French horticulturist (d. 1862)
  - Bartholomew Frere, English diplomat (d. 1851)
- December 1
  - Elijah H. Mills, American politician (d. 1829)
  - Isaac Lacey, American politician (d. 1844)
- December 2 – Louis Alexis Baudoin, French naval officer (d. 1805)
- December 3
  - Yashwantrao Holkar, Ruler of Holkar State (d. 1811)
  - Nicolas Charles Seringe, French physician, botanist (d. 1858)
- December 5 – Konrad Johann Martin Langenbeck, German surgeon (d. 1851)
- December 6 – Theodorick Bland, United States federal judge (d. 1846)
- December 7 – Reuben Whallon, American politician (d. 1843)
- December 8
  - Theodore Dehon, second Episcopal Bishop of South Carolina (d. 1817)
  - William Logan, American politician (d. 1822)
- December 10
  - Archduchess Maria Leopoldine of Austria-Este, second wife of Charles Theodore (d. 1848)
  - David Marchand, American politician (d. 1832)
  - Abraham Mendelssohn Bartholdy, German banker, father of classical composer Felix Mendelssohn Bartholdy (d. 1835)
- December 12 – Nicholas Conyngham Tindal, English lawyer, politician (d. 1846)
- December 13 – James Hawkes, American politician (d. 1865)
- December 14 – Ingelbrecht Knudssøn, Norwegian politician (d. 1826)
- December 16
  - Narciso Durán, Spanish Franciscan missionary to Mexico (d. 1846)
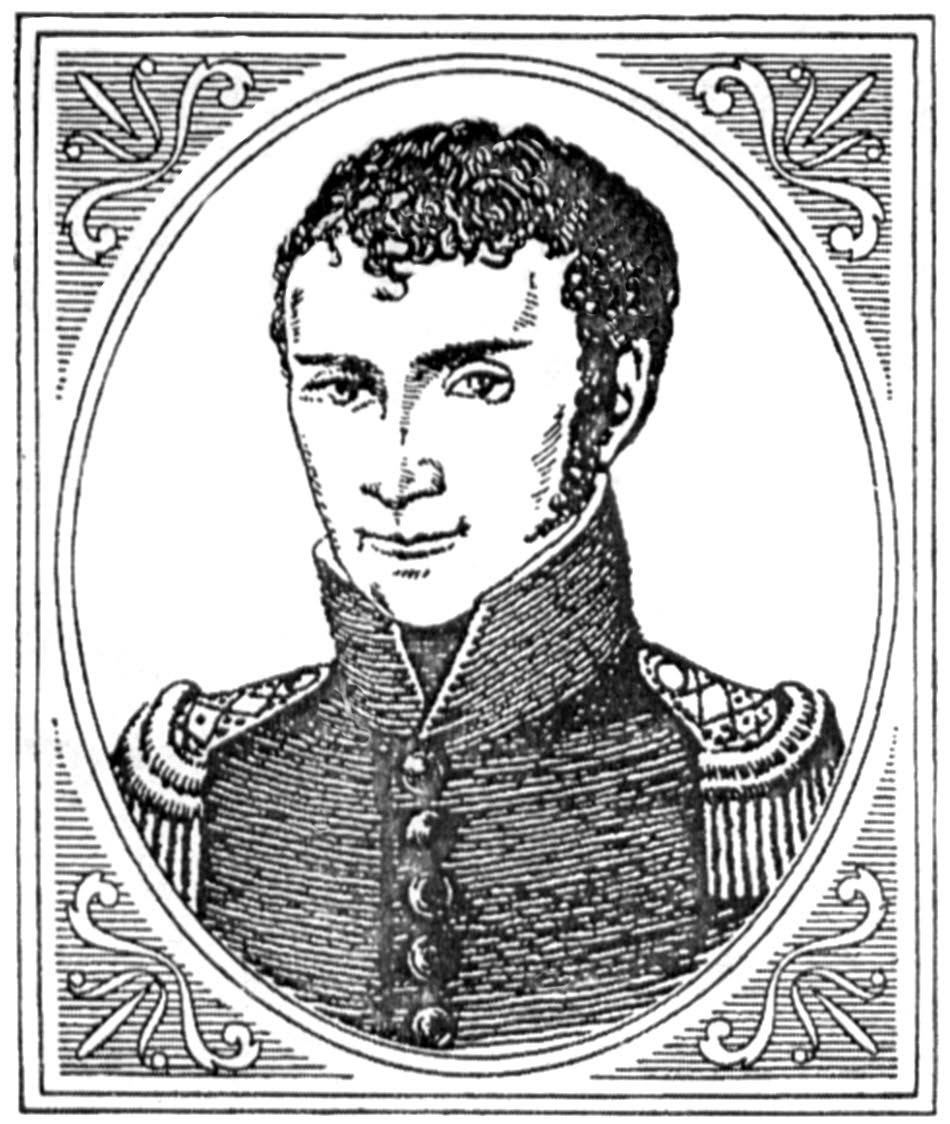
    Johann Wilhelm Ritter
  - Johann Wilhelm Ritter, German chemist (d. 1810)
- December 19
  - Lord Edward Somerset, British Army general (d. 1842)
  - Lars Roverud, Norwegian musician (d. 1850)
  - Eusebio Bardají y Azara, Prime Minister of Spain (d. 1842)
- December 20 – José María del Castillo y Rada, President of Colombia (d. 1833)
- December 25 – John Slater, American businessman (d. 1843)
- December 26 – Charles Hamilton Smith, British artist (d. 1859)
- December 27 – Nikolay Kamensky, Russian general (d. 1811)
- December 29 – Gustaf af Wetterstedt, Swedish politician (d. 1837)
- December 30 – William Drayton, American politician (d. 1846)
- December 31 – Johann Spurzheim, German physician (d. 1832)

1777

=== January–March ===
- January – William Barton, English cricketer (d. 1825)
- January 2 – Christian Daniel Rauch, German sculptor (d. 1857)
- January 7 – Lorenzo Bartolini, Italian sculptor (d. 1850)
- January 11 – Vincenzo Borg, Maltese merchant, rebel leader (d. 1837)
- January 13 – Elisa Bonaparte, Grand Duchess of Tuscany, sister of Napoleon Bonaparte (d. 1820)
- January 25 – Karoline Jagemann, German actor (d.1848)
- February 3 – John Cheyne, British physician, surgeon and author (d. 1836)
- February 10 – Amable Berthelot, Quebec lawyer, author and political figure (d. 1847)
- February 12
  - Friedrich de la Motte Fouqué, French poet (d. 1843)
  - Bernard Courtois, French chemist (d. 1838)
- February 18 – Andreas Arntzen, Norwegian politician (d. 1837)
- February 20 – Zacheus Burnham, Canadian farmer, judge and public figure (d. 1857)
- February 26 – Matija Nenadović, Prime Minister of Serbia (d. 1854)
- March 3 – Adolphe Dureau de la Malle, French geographer, naturalist, historian and artist (d. 1857)
- March 10 – Robert Allison (Pennsylvania politician), U.S. Representative (d. 1840)
- March 13 – Charles Lot Church, Nova Scotia politician (d. 1864)

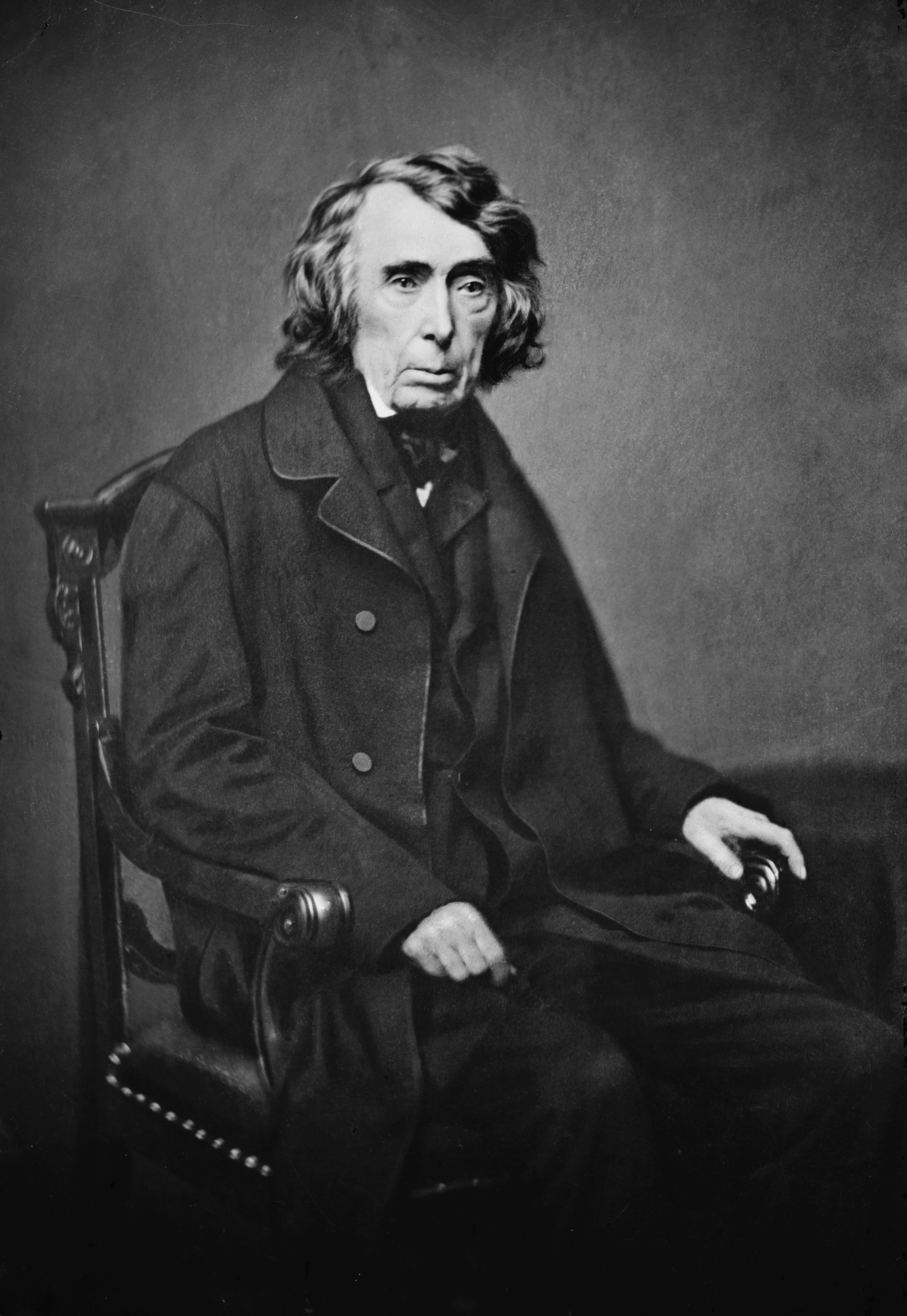
Roger B. Taney

- March 17
  - Patrick Brontë, Irish Anglican curate and writer; father of writers Charlotte, Emily and Anne Brontë (d. 1861)
  - Roger B. Taney, Chief Justice of the United States (d. 1864)
- March 19 – José María Bustamante, Mexican composer (d. 1861)
- March 28 – Antoine Germain Labarraque, French chemist (d. 1850)

=== April–June ===
- April 11 – William Addams, United States Congressman (d. 1858)
- April 12 – Henry Clay, American politician (d. 1852)
- April 16 – John Alexander (Ohio politician), U.S. Representative (d. 1848)

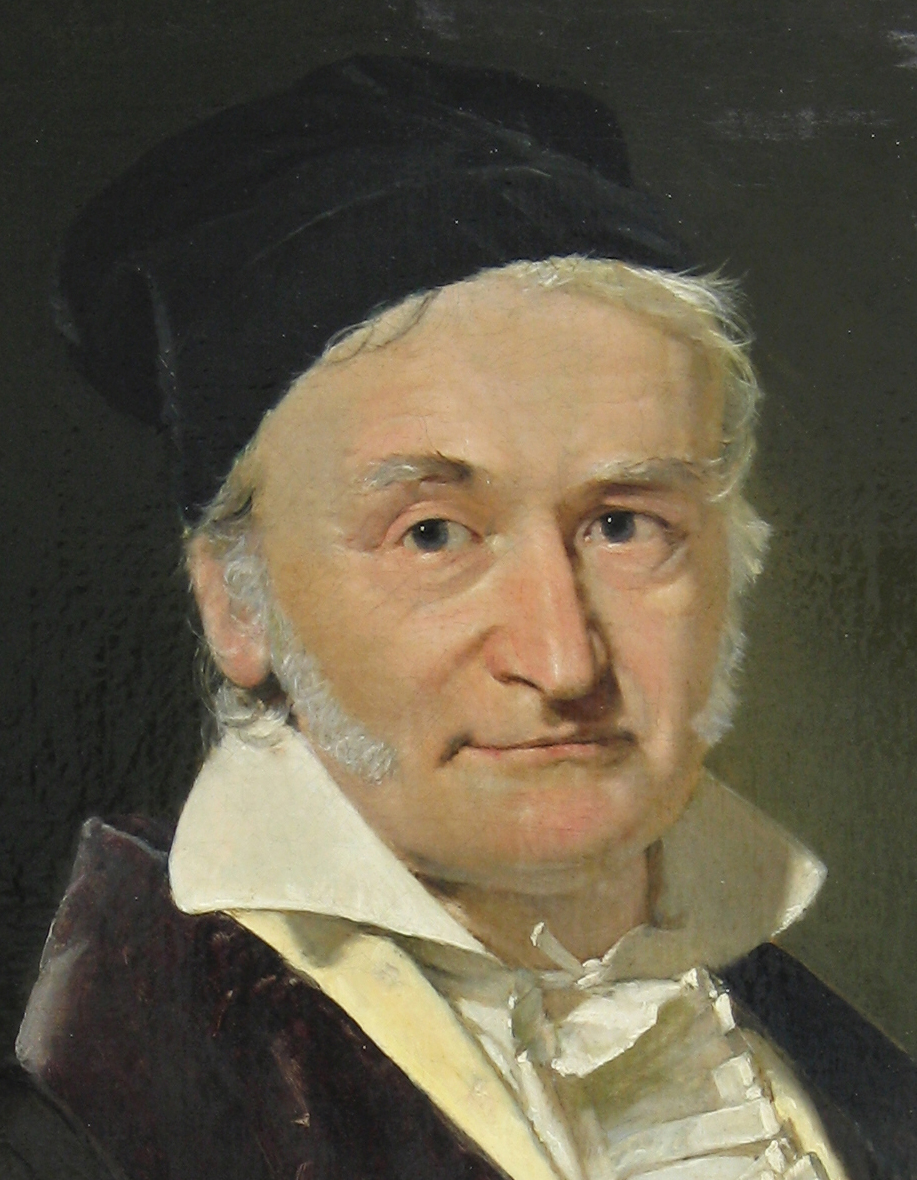
Carl Friedrich Gauss

- April 30 – Carl Friedrich Gauss, German mathematician, astronomer and physicist (d. 1855)
- May 4 – Richard Bourke, Australian governor (d. 1855)
- May 8 – Mateli Magdalena Kuivalatar, Finnish-Karelian folksinger (d. 1846)
- May 11 – Samuel Bridger, English cricketer
- May 12 – Mary Reibey, Australian businessperson (d. 1855)
- May 18 – John George Children, British chemist, mineralogist and zoologist (d. 1852)
- June 1 – Fernando Errázuriz Aldunate, president of Chile (d. 1841)
- June 12 – Robert Clark, American politician (d. 1837)
- June 14 – Heman Allen (of Milton), U.S. Representative (d. 1844)
- June 15 – David Daniel Davis, British physician (d. 1841)
- June 22
  - Andrzej Alojzy Ankwicz, Polish-born Catholic archbishop of Prague (d. 1838)
  - William Brown (admiral), Irish-born first admiral of Argentina (d. 1857)
- June 23 – Frederick Bates, American politician (d. 1825)

=== July–September ===
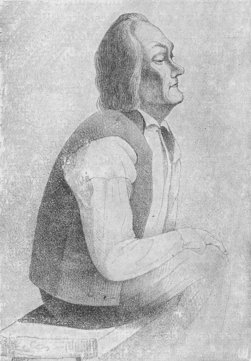
Paavo Ruotsalainen

- July – Thomas Clayton, American lawyer, politician (d. 1854)
- July 9
  - Henry Hallam, English historian (d. 1859)
  - Paavo Ruotsalainen, Finnish farmer and lay preacher (d. 1852)
- July 23 – Philipp Otto Runge, German painter (d. 1810)
- July 26 – Robert Hamilton Bishop, Scottish-American educator, minister (d. 1855)
- July 27
  - Heinrich Wilhelm Brandes, German physicist (d. 1834)
  - Thomas Campbell, Scottish poet (d. 1844)
  - Henry Trevor, 21st Baron Dacre, British peer, soldier (d. 1853)
- July 31 – Pedro Ignacio de Castro Barros, Argentine statesman, priest (d. 1849)
- August 11 – Giuseppe Bossi, Italian painter (d. 1815)
- August 12 – George Wolf, American politician (d. 1840)

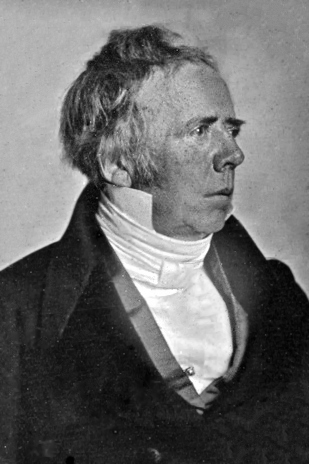
Hans Christian Ørsted

- August 14 – Hans Christian Ørsted, Danish physicist and chemist (d. 1851)
- August 23 – Princess Adélaïde of Orléans, French princess (d. 1847)
- August 29 – Nikita Bichurin (Hyacinth), Russian monk (d. 1853)
- August 30 – Parashuramrao Shrinivas I, Indian nobleman (d. 1848)
- August 31 – Alexander Bashilov, Russian general (d. 1847)
- September 9 – James Carr (Massachusetts politician), U.S. Congressman (d. 1818)
- September 12 – Henri Marie Ducrotay de Blainville, French zoologist, anatomist (d. 1850)
- September 25 – Joseph Badeaux, Canadian politician (d. 1835)

=== October–December ===
- October 1 – Zaro Aga, Turkish-Kurdish possible supercentenarian (claimed to have been born this year or 1774; d. 1934)
- October 5 – Guillaume Dupuytren, French anatomist, military surgeon (d. 1835)
- October 16
  - Levi Barber, American surveyor, court administrator, banker and legislator (d. 1833)
  - Lorenzo Dow, American Methodist preacher (d. 1834)
- October 18
  - Auguste François-Marie de Colbert-Chabanais, French general (d. 1809)

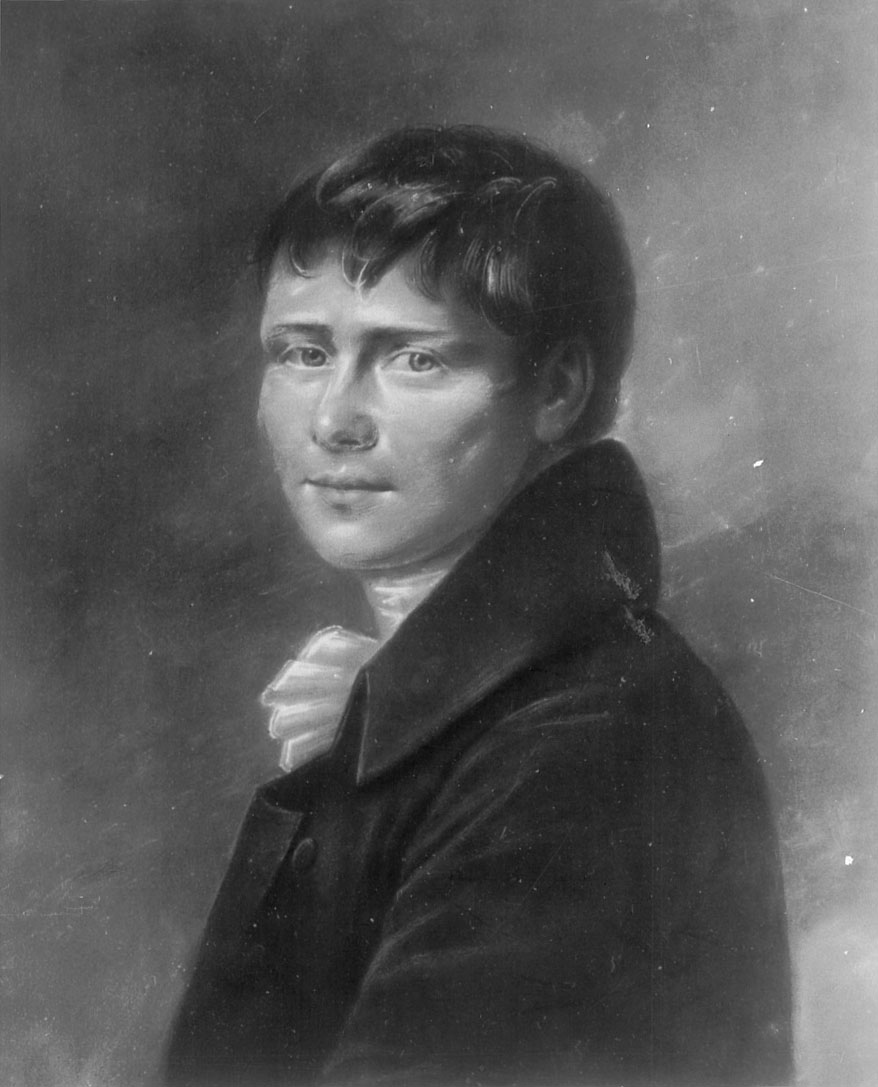
Heinrich von Kleist

  - Heinrich von Kleist, German poet, dramatist, novelist and short story writer (d. 1811)
- November 7 – Richard Bassett (clergyman), Welsh cleric (d. 1852)
- November 13 – Kunwar Singh, Leader during the Indian Rebellion of 1857 (d. 1858)
- November 14 – Nathaniel Claiborne, American politician (d. 1859)
- November 24 – Samuel Butts, American militia officer (d. 1814)
- December 1 – Thomas Bradford, British Army officer (d. 1853)
- December 4 – Juliette Récamier, French writer (d. 1849)
- December 10 – William Conner, American trader, politician (d. 1855)
- December 14 – Du Pré Alexander, 2nd Earl of Caledon, Irish peer, landlord and colonial administrator (d. 1839)
- December 15 – Agostino Aglio, Italian painter, decorator and engraver (d. 1857)
- December 16 – Madame Clicquot Ponsardin, French champagne producer (d. 1866)
- December 21 – John Campbell, 7th Duke of Argyll, Scottish peer, Whig politician (d. 1847)

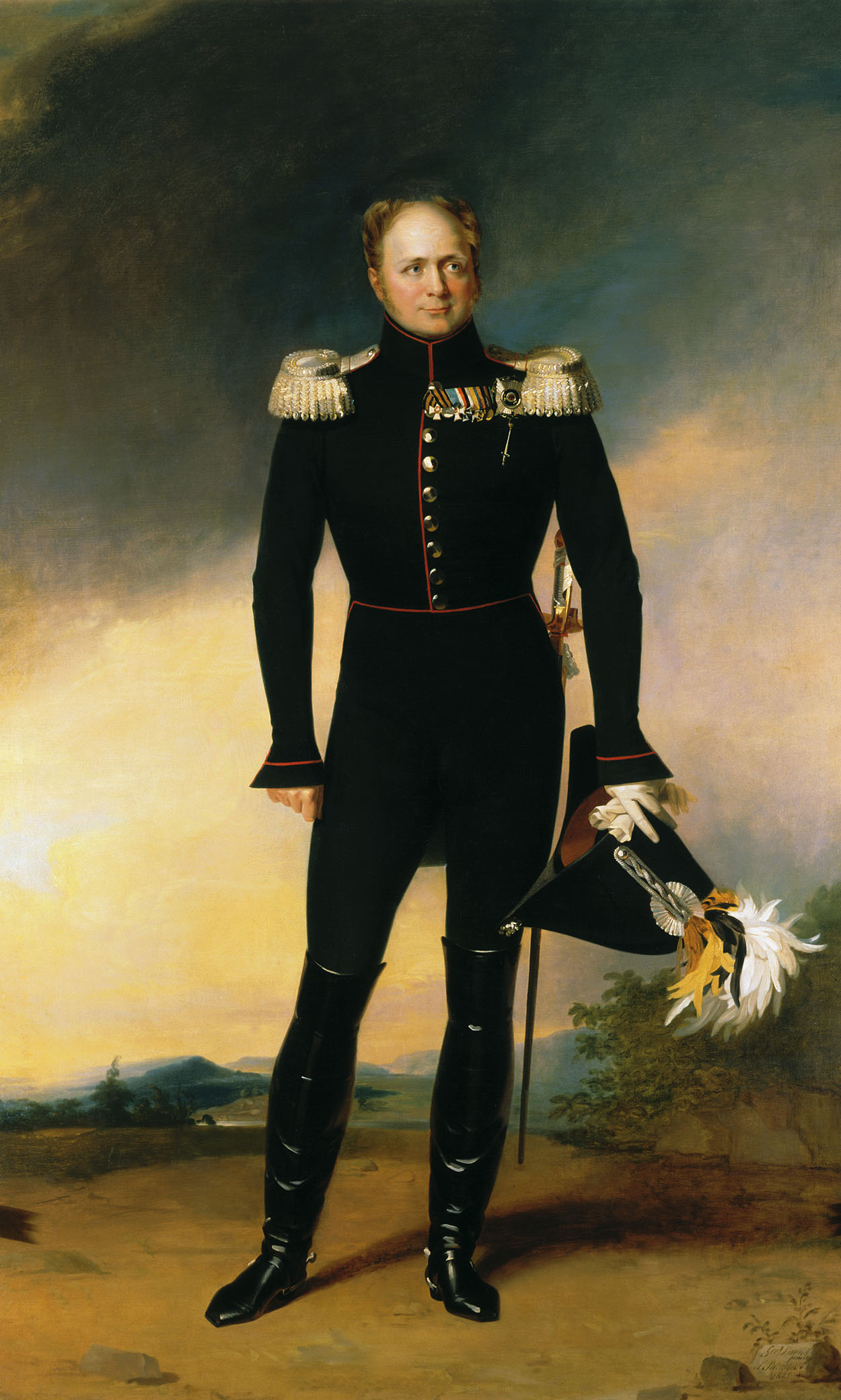
Alexander I of Russia

- December 23 – Emperor Alexander I of Russia, Russian officer (d. 1825)
- December 24 – Barbara Spooner Wilberforce, wife of English abolitionist William Wilberforce (d. 1847)

=== Date unknown ===
- Suleiman al-Halabi, Syrian student, assassin (d. 1800)
- Carlos Anaya, Uruguayan politician (d. 1862)
- Charles James Apperley, English sportsman, sporting writer (d. 1843)
- Carlo Armellini, Italian politician, activist and jurist (d. 1863)
- Mevlana Halid-i Bagdadi, Ottoman mystic (d. 1826)
- Connell James Baldwin, Irish soldier, civil servant (d. 1861)
- Karl Friedrich Becker, German educator, historian (d. 1806)
- Vicente Benavides, Chilean soldier (d. 1822)
- John Bennett (Hampshire cricketer) (d. 1857)
- William Bellinger Bulloch, U.S. Senator (d. 1852)
- Sophia Campbell, Australian artist (d. 1833)
- Abiel Chandler, U.S. philanthropist (d. 1851)
- John Claiborne, U.S. politician (d. 1808)
- Charles Othon Frédéric Jean-Baptiste de Clarac, French artist, scholar and archaeologist (d. 1847)
- Thomas Cochran (judge), Canadian judge (d. 1804)
- Anselmo de la Cruz, Chilean political figure (d. 1833)
- Thomas Day, American judge (d. 1855)
- Benjamin D'Urban, British general, colonial administrator (d. 1849)
- Tu'i Malila, Malagasy-born tortoise, longest living animal on record (d. 1965)

1778

=== January–April ===
- January 1
  - Tredwell Scudder, American politician (d. 1834)
  - Charles Alexandre Lesueur, French naturalist (d. 1846)
- January 3 – Antoni Melchior Fijałkowski, Polish Catholic bishop (d. 1861)
- January 4
  - Billy J. Clark, American politician (d. 1866)
  - Paolo Polidori, Italian Catholic cardinal (d. 1847)
  - Jean-Antoine Alavoine, French architect (d. 1834)
- January 5 – Charles-Guillaume Étienne, French writer (d. 1845)

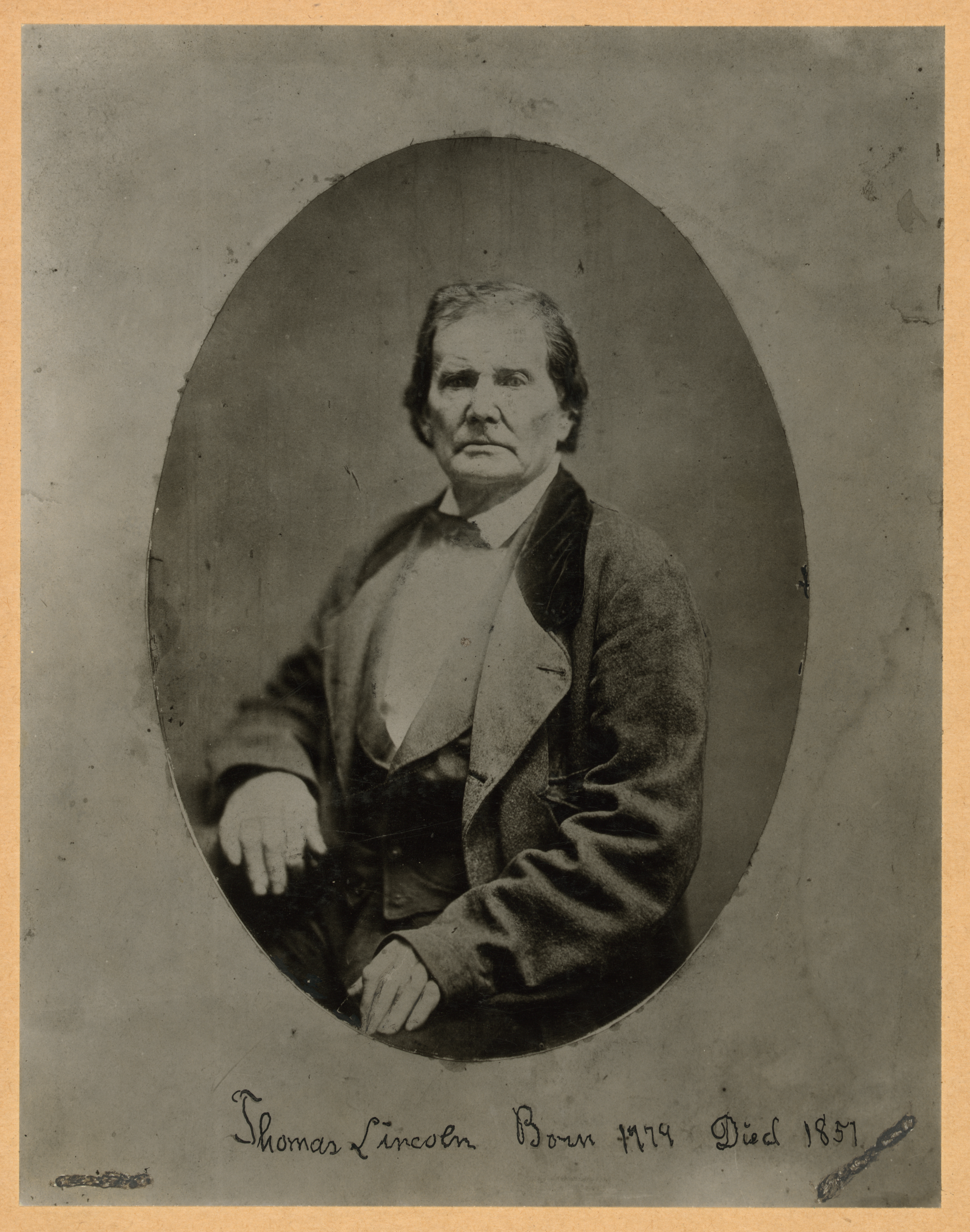
Thomas Lincoln

- January 6 – Thomas Lincoln, Farmer, Carpenter (d. 1851)
- January 7 – Anthony Todd Thomson, British dermatologist (d. 1849)
- January 9 – Thomas Brown, Scottish metaphysician (d. 1820)
- January 10 – Teodoro Sánchez de Bustamante, Argentine politician (d. 1851)
- January 11 – Agathon Jean François Fain, French historian (d. 1837)
- January 12 – William Herbert, British politician (d. 1847)
- January 13 – Sir Isaac Goldsmid, 1st Baronet, British financier and one of the leading figures in the Jewish emancipation in the United Kingdom (d. 1859)
- January 15 – Joseph Adamy, Nassauian politician (d. 1849)
- January 16
  - Teodoro Lechi, Italian general (d. 1866)
  - John Arbuthnott, 8th Viscount of Arbuthnott, Scottish peer and soldier (d. 1860)
- January 17
  - Donald Macdonell, Canadian politician (d. 1861)
  - George Black, Canadian politician, businessman and important shipbuilder in Quebec during the early decades of the 19th century (d. 1854)
- January 18 – George Bellas Greenough, British geologist (d. 1855)
- January 20 – Louis Antoine François Baillon, French naturalist, collector (d. 1855)
- January 21 – Jeremiah O'Brien, American politician (d. 1858)
- January 23 – Alire Raffeneau Delile, French botanist (d. 1850)
- January 24 – Charles Ferdinand, Duke of Berry, England (d. 1820)
- January 25 – Matsudaira Norihiro, Japanese daimyō who ruled the Nishio Domain (d. 1839)
- January 26
  - Jakob von Washington, Bavarian general (d. 1848)
  - Johann Georg Stauffer, Austrian luthier (d. 1853)
- January 27
  - Christian Mathias Schröder, German politician (d. 1860)
  - Andrew Sterett, United States Navy officer (d. 1807)
- January 28 – James Tallmadge, Jr., American politician (d. 1853)
- January 29 – John Williams, Tennessee politician (d. 1837)
- January 31 – Franz Anton von Kolowrat-Liebsteinsky, Austrian statesman (d. 1861)
- February 1 – Joseph Richardson, American politician (d. 1871)
- February 2 – Mary Anne Talbot, British wartime cross-dresser (d. 1808)
- February 3
  - Cornelis Vollenhoven, Dutch politician (d. 1849)
  - John Ritchie, British newspaper founder (d. 1870)
- February 4 – Augustin Pyramus de Candolle, Swiss botanist (d. 1841)
- February 5 – Jan Nepomucen Umiński, Polish general (d. 1851)
- February 6 – Ugo Foscolo, Italian writer, revolutionary and poet (d. 1827)
- February 13 – William P. Van Ness, United States federal judge (d. 1826)
- February 14 – Fernando Sor, Spanish musician (d. 1839)
- February 16
  - John Colborne, 1st Baron Seaton of Great Britain (d. 1863)
  - Rosalie Stier Calvert, 19th century Maryland plantation owner, correspondent (d. 1821)
- February 19
  - Friedrich Karl von Tettenborn, Russian military commander (d. 1845)
  - Henry Ashley, American politician (d. 1829)
  - Daniel Williams Harmon, American-born Canadian fur trader, diarist (d. 1843)
- February 22
  - Sir Roger Martin, 5th Baronet of Great Britain (d. 1854)
  - Rembrandt Peale, American painter (d. 1860)

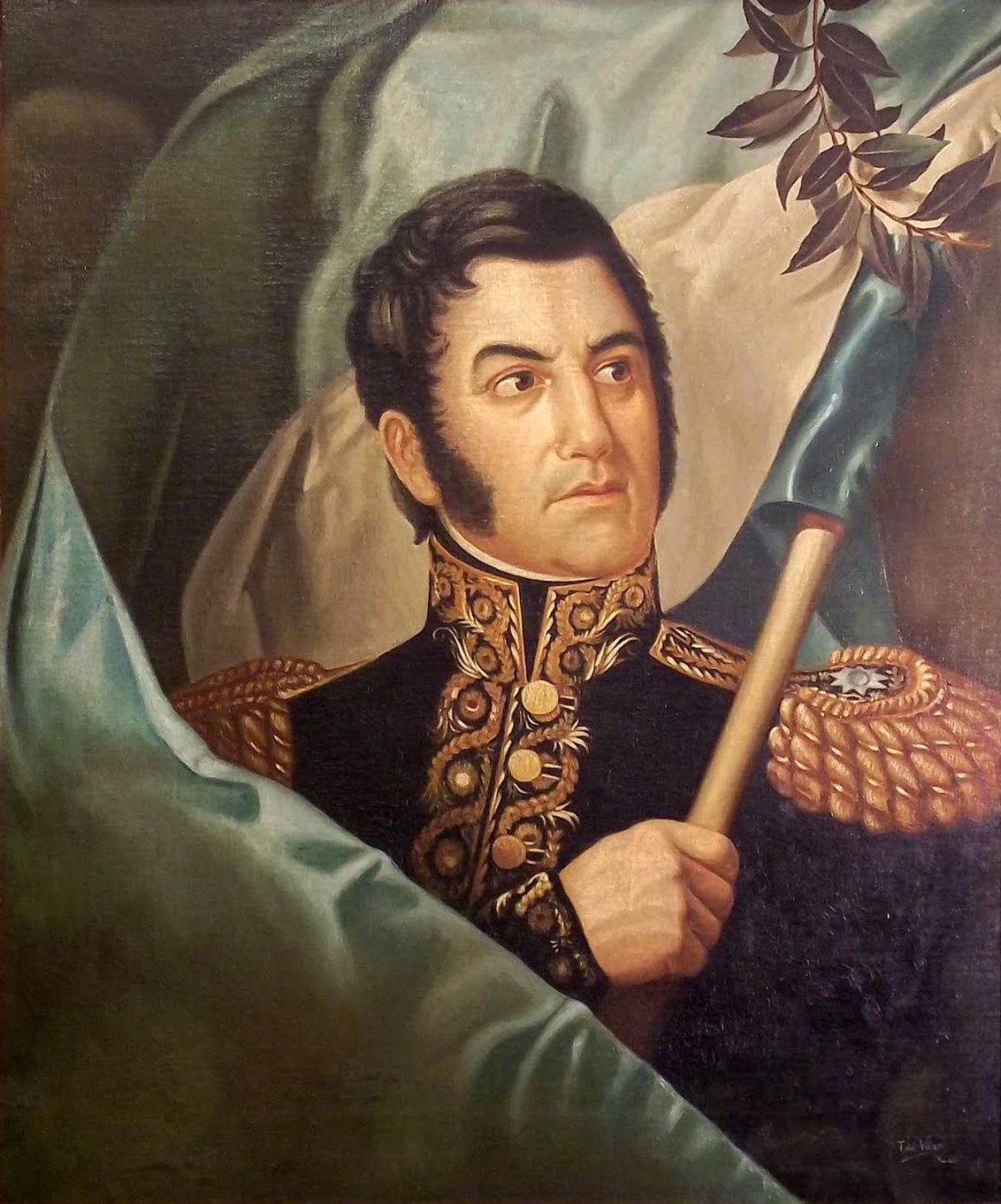
José de San Martín

- February 25 – José de San Martín, Argentine general (d. 1850)
- March 1
  - Chrétien Géofroy Nestler, French botanist (d. 1832)
  - Amos Lane, American politician (d. 1849)
- March 2
  - William Austin, American politician (d. 1841)
  - Vincent Moulac, French naval officer (d. 1836)
- March 3
  - Princess Frederica of Mecklenburg-Strelitz (d. 1841)
  - Peter Laurie, British politician (d. 1861)
- March 4
  - Sir Henry Bunbury, 7th Baronet, British Army general (d. 1860)
  - Robert Emmet, Irish rebel (d. 1803)
  - Florestano Pepe, Italian general (d. 1851)
- March 6
  - Francis Ogilvy-Grant, 6th Earl of Seafield, British politician (d. 1853)
  - Carl Bernhard von Trinius, German botanist (d. 1844)
- March 8 – Jean-Toussaint Arrighi de Casanova, French soldier, diplomat (d. 1853)
- March 10
  - Hugh Hornby Birley, leading Manchester Tory, reputed to have led the fatal charge of the Manchester and Salford Yeomanry, at the Peterloo Massacre (d. 1845)
  - Anthony Van Egmond, Canadian rebel (d. 1838)
- March 19 – Edward Pakenham, Irish-born British general (d. 1815)
- March 22
  - Thomas de Trafford, British Baronet (d. 1852)
  - Aleksey Merzlyakov, Russian poet, critic, and professor (d. 1830)
- March 23 – Paul Traugott Meissner, Austrian chemist (d. 1864)
- March 24
  - Robert Fleming Gourlay, British statistician and activist (d. 1863)
  - Anton Edler von Gapp, Austrian lawyer (d. 1862)
- March 25 – Sophie Blanchard, French aeronaut (d. 1819)
- March 26 – Edward Blakeney, British Army officer (d. 1868)
- March 28 – Ludvig Stoud Platou, Norwegian politician (d. 1833)
- March 30 – Robert Moore, American politician (d. 1831)
- March 31 – Coenraad Jacob Temminck, Dutch zoologist (d. 1858)
- April 1 – Benjamin Jacob, British musician (d. 1829)
- April 3 – Pierre Bretonneau, French physician (d. 1862)
- April 7 – John J. Ely, Member of the New Jersey General Assembly (d. 1852)
- April 9
  - John Sparks, English cricketer (d. 1854)
  - Louis de Beaupoil de Saint-Aulaire, French diplomat (d. 1854)

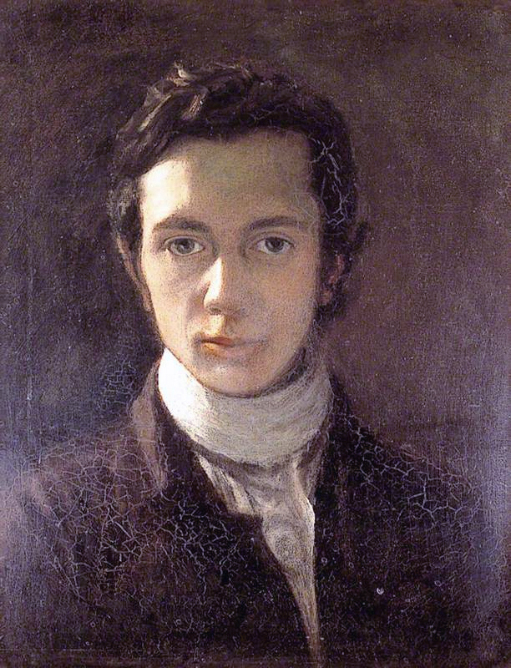
William Hazlitt

- April 10
  - Heinrich Luden, German historian (d. 1847)
  - William Hazlitt, English writer (d. 1830)
  - Johann Arzberger, Austrian technologist (d. 1835)
- April 12 – John Strachan, Bishop of Toronto (d. 1867)
- April 14 – George Philipp Ludolf von Beckedorff, prominent Prussian Catholic convert, parliamentarian (d. 1858)
- April 15
  - William Congreve Russell, British politician (d. 1850)
  - James Crooks, Canadian politician (d. 1860)
- April 18
  - Mary Bruce, Countess of Elgin, Scottish countess (d. 1855)
  - Christian Friedrich Nasse, German physician, psychiatrist (d. 1851)
  - Sir Matthew White Ridley, 3rd Baronet, British politician (d. 1836)
- April 19 – Elizabeth Wynne Fremantle, main author of the extensive Wynne Diaries, wife of Royal Navy officer Thomas Fremantle (1765–1819) (d. 1857)
- April 23 – John Harvey, British Army general (d. 1852)
- April 24 – John Graham, soldier notable for founding Grahamstown (d. 1821)
- April 27 – Henry Drury, English educator (d. 1841)
- April 28 – Adriaan van der Hoop, Dutch banker, politician (d. 1854)
- April 29 – Thomas Bateman, British physician, pioneer in the field of dermatology (d. 1821)
- April 30 – Arvid David Hummel, Swedish entomologist (d. 1836)

=== May–August ===
- May 2 – Nathan Bangs, American Methodist theologian (d. 1862)
- May 3 – Samuel Freeze, Canadian politician (d. 1844)
- May 6 – Henry Phillpotts, English bishop (d. 1869)
- May 8 – Marie-Louise Coidavid, Queen of the Kingdom of Haiti (1811–20) as the spouse of Henri I of Haiti (d. 1851)
- May 9 – Eli Ayers, Liberian politician (d. 1822)
- May 10 – William Ladd, American activist (d. 1841)
- May 12 – August Zeune, German educator (d. 1853)
- May 13 – Honoré V, Prince of Monaco (d. 1841)
- May 17 – Benjamin Bowring, English watchmaker (d. 1846)
- May 18
  - Andrew Ure, Scottish doctor and chemist (d. 1857)
  - Samuel Hoar, American politician (d. 1856)
  - Charles Vane, 3rd Marquess of Londonderry, British politician (d. 1854)
- May 19
  - Ruggero Settimo, Italian politician (d. 1863)
  - Ludwik Michał Pac, Polish general (d. 1835)
- May 25 – Claus Harms, German clergyman, theologian (d. 1855)
- May 29 – Charles Kemeys Kemeys Tynte, British politician (d. 1860)
- May 30 – Richard Skinner, American politician (d. 1833)
- May 31 – Horatio Seymour, American politician (d. 1857)
- June 2 – Jean Julien Angot des Rotours, French colonial governor (d. 1844)
- June 4 – Martin Parmer, American politician (d. 1850)
- June 6 – Edmund Varney, American politician (d. 1847)
- June 7 – David Willson, Canadian Quaker minister (d. 1866)
- June 11 – John Robison, British inventor (d. 1843)
- June 13 – Frederick Louis, Hereditary Grand Duke of Mecklenburg-Schwerin (d. 1819)
- June 14 – John Cushing Aylwin, United States naval officer (War of 1812) (d. 1813)

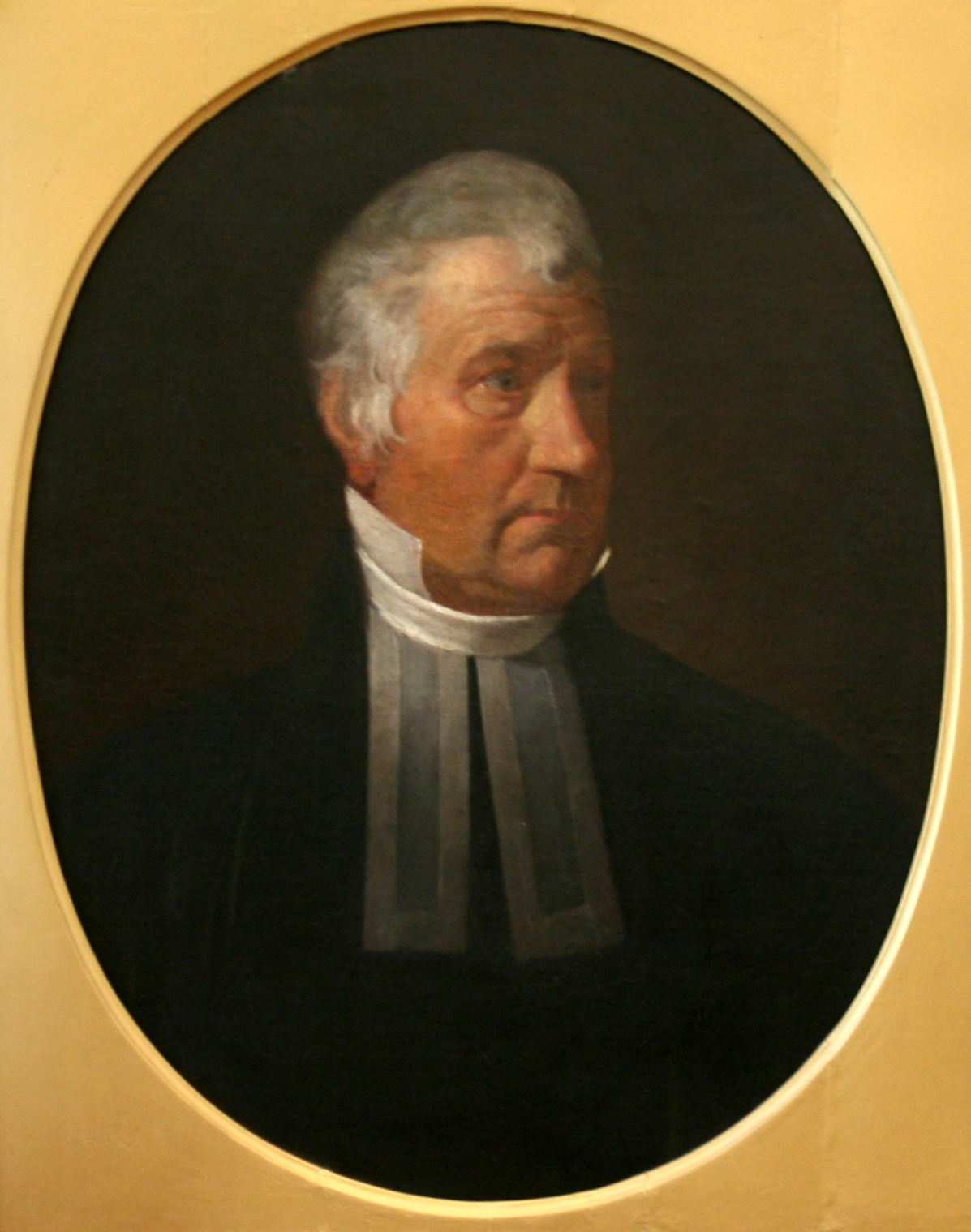
Harry Croswell

- June 16
  - Charles F. Mercer, American politician (d. 1858)
  - Harry Croswell, crusading American political journalist (d. 1858)
- June 17
  - Philip Willem van Heusde, Dutch philosopher (d. 1839)
  - Gregory Blaxland, English pioneer farmer, explorer in Australia (d. 1852)
- June 19 – Robert Allen, Tennessee politician (d. 1844)
- June 20 – Jean Baptiste Gay, vicomte de Martignac, moderate royalist French statesman, during the Bourbon Restoration (1814–30) under King Charles X (d. 1832)
- June 22 – George Percy, 5th Duke of Northumberland, British politician (d. 1867)
- June 23 – Richard W. Meade, American merchant and art collector (d. 1828)
- June 26 – Mariya Svistunova, lady-in-waiting at the Russian Court (d. 1866)
- June 27 – Sir John Astley, 1st Baronet, British politician (d. 1842)
- June 28
  - John Macbride, British historian (d. 1868)
  - William Dietz, American politician (d. 1848)
- July 2 – Daniel Wilson, Bishop of Calcutta (d. 1858)
- July 3 – Carl Ludvig Engel, German architect (d. 1840)
- July 6 – Jean Baptiste Bory de Saint-Vincent, French scientist (d. 1846)
- July 7 – Beau Brummell, English man of fashion (d. 1840)
- July 10
  - William Brockenbrough, American politician (d. 1838)
  - Laurent Cunin-Gridaine, French businessman, politician (d. 1859)
- July 11 – Timothy Fuller, American politician (d. 1835)
- July 12 – Maria Dalle Donne, Bolognese physician (d. 1842)
- July 13 – Samuel Stevens, Jr., American politician (d. 1860)
- July 15
  - Thomas James Maling, British Royal Navy officer (d. 1849)
  - Jasper Nicolls, British general (d. 1849)
- July 17 – Benjamin Isaacs, Connecticut politician (d. 1846)
- July 19
  - Thomas Foley, British politician (d. 1822)
  - Samuel Bent, American Mormon leader (d. 1846)
- July 20 – Joshua Tetley, British brewer (d. 1859)
- July 28 – Charles Stewart, American naval commander (d. 1869)
- July 30
  - David Pattee, Canadian politician (d. 1851)
  - Henry, Duke of Anhalt-Köthen (d. 1847)
- August 2 – Georg Anton Rollett, Austrian naturalist (d. 1842)
- August 5 – Otto Christian Blandow, German bryologist (d. 1810)
- August 8 – John Bonfoy Rooper, British landowner, MP (d. 1855)

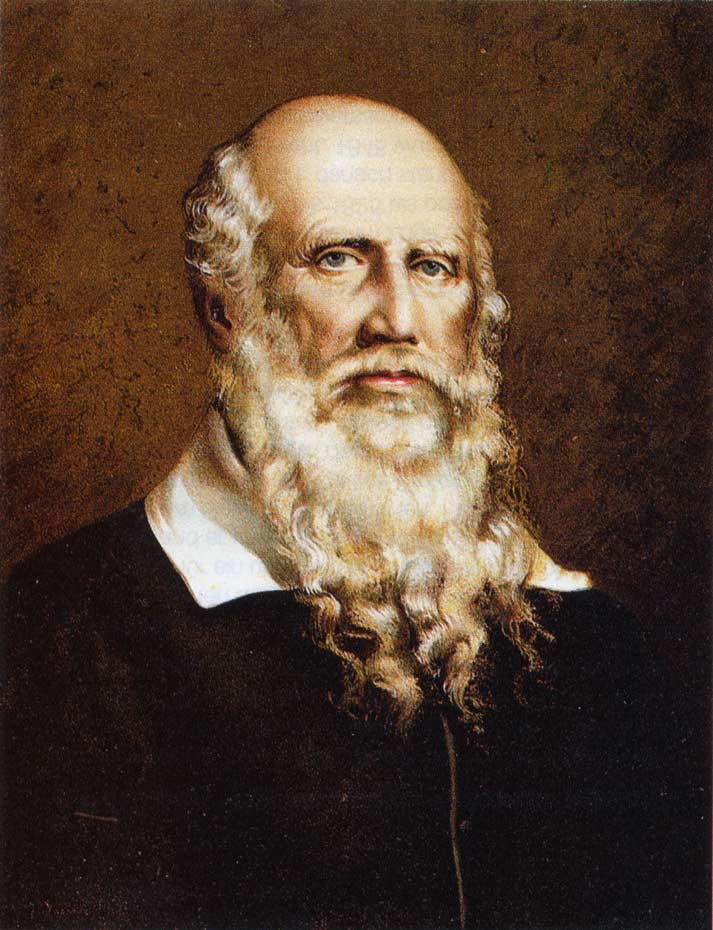
Friedrich Ludwig Jahn

- August 11
  - Marcus Pløen, Norwegian businessperson (d. 1836)
  - Charles Pierrepont, 2nd Earl Manvers, British naval officer and politician (d. 1860)
  - Friedrich Ludwig Jahn, German-Prussian gymnastics educator, nationalist (d. 1852)
- August 12
  - Francis Horner, British politician (d. 1817)
  - Joshua Vanneck, 2nd Baron Huntingfield, British politician (d. 1844)
- August 19
  - Princess Sophie of Saxe-Coburg-Saalfeld, German princess (d. 1835)
  - James Harris, 2nd Earl of Malmesbury, British politician (d. 1841)

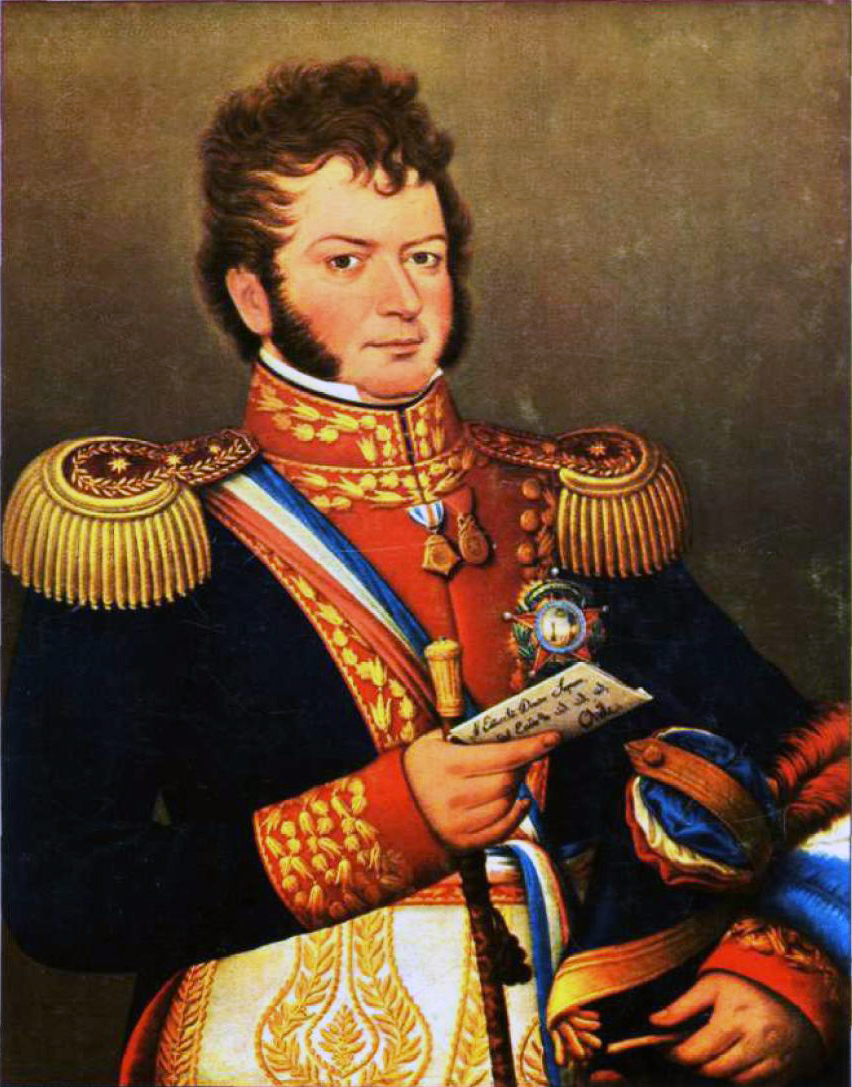
Bernardo O'Higgins

- August 20 – Bernardo O'Higgins, Supreme Director of Chile (d. 1842)
- August 21 – Lewis Weston Dillwyn, British politician (d. 1855)
- August 25 – Joseph Batten, British college principal (d. 1837)
- August 31 – William Wilkins, English architect (d. 1839)

=== September–December ===
- September 2 – Louis Bonaparte, brother of Napoleon Bonaparte, French army general, King of Holland (d. 1846)
- September 7 – José Bernardo Sánchez, Spanish missionary (d. 1833)
- September 8 – George Heneage Lawrence Dundas, British Royal Navy admiral (d. 1834)

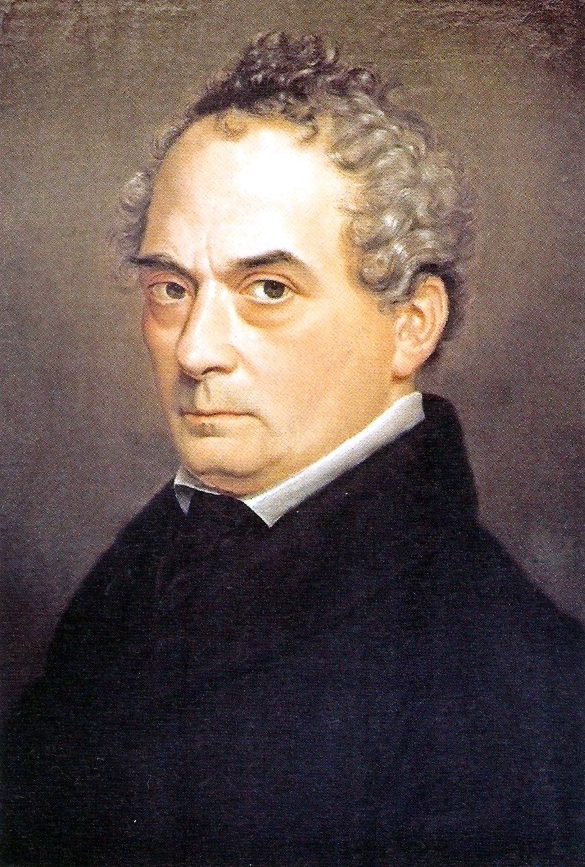
Clemens Brentano

- September 9 – Clemens Brentano, German poet, novelist (d. 1842)
- September 10 – Joshua Lawrence, American Baptist minister (d. 1843)
- September 12 – William Davidson, American politician (d. 1857)
- September 14
  - John Varnum, American politician (d. 1836)
  - John Barss, Canadian politician (d. 1851)
- September 15 – Augustin Caron, Canadian politician (d. 1862)
- September 19
  - Henry Brougham, 1st Baron Brougham and Vaux, British politician (d. 1868)
  - William Gaston, American politician (d. 1844)
- September 20
  - James Mann, 5th Earl Cornwallis of Great Britain (d. 1852)
  - Fabian Gottlieb von Bellingshausen, Russian admiral (d. 1852)
- September 21 – Carl Ludwig Koch, German entomologist (d. 1857)
- September 24 – Michał Gedeon Radziwiłł, Polish-Lithuanian noble (d. 1850)
- September 25
  - Sir Charles Oakeley, 2nd Baronet, 2nd Baronet in the Oakeley Baronets (d. 1829)
  - Prince Louis of Anhalt-Köthen, Duke of Anhalt-Köthen (d. 1802)
- September 26 – Jonathan Fisk, American politician (d. 1832)
- September 27
  - Carl Friedrich Rungenhagen, German composer, music teacher (d. 1851)
  - Damião Barbosa de Araújo, Brazilian composer (d. 1856)
- September 28
  - Luther Lawrence, American politician (d. 1839)
  - Suzanne Douvillier, French-born American ballerina, mime & choreographer (d. 1826)
  - Catherine McAuley, Irish nun, saint (d. 1841)
- September 29
  - Benjamin Hall, British politician (d. 1817)
  - Thomas Warsop, English cricketer (d. 1845)
- October 5
  - Ernst Ludwig von Aster, Prussian and Russian Army general (d. 1855)
  - Jacques Joseph Champollion-Figeac, French archaeologist (d. 1867)
- October 7
  - Charles Paget, British Royal Navy admiral (d. 1839)
  - Joseph Knight, English horticulturist (d. 1855)
  - Thomas Cranley Onslow, British politician (d. 1861)
- October 8 – Hyacinthe-Louis de Quélen, French Catholic bishop (d. 1839)
- October 9
  - Pierre-Denis, Comte de Peyronnet, President of the Bordeaux Court in France (1815) (d. 1854)
  - John FitzMaurice, Viscount Kirkwall, British politician (d. 1820)
  - Sir Lionel Smith, 1st Baronet, British Army general (d. 1842)
- October 13 – William Marks, American politician (d. 1858)
- October 14 – Francis Fane, British Royal Navy admiral (d. 1844)
- October 19 – Valentine Blacker, Irish-born Surveyor General of India (d. 1826)
- October 22 – Javier de Burgos, Spanish writer, politician and jurist (d. 1849)
- October 23 – Kittur Chennamma, Indian queen regnant (d. 1829)
- October 26 – Charles Grant, 1st Baron Glenelg, British politician (d. 1866)
- October 28 – Ezekiel Blomfield, British minister (d. 1818)
- October 29 – William Creighton, Jr., United States federal judge (d. 1851)
- October 30 – Benjamin Ames, American politician (d. 1835)
- October 31
  - Jacob Shibley, Canadian politician (d. 1862)
  - Charles Abraham Elton, English author (d. 1853)
  - John Black, Australian sailor (d. 1802)
- November 1
  - James R. Caldwell, United States Navy officer (d. 1804)
  - Gustav IV Adolf, King of Sweden (d. 1837)
- November 3 – Karlo Lanza, Dalmatian politician (d. 1834)

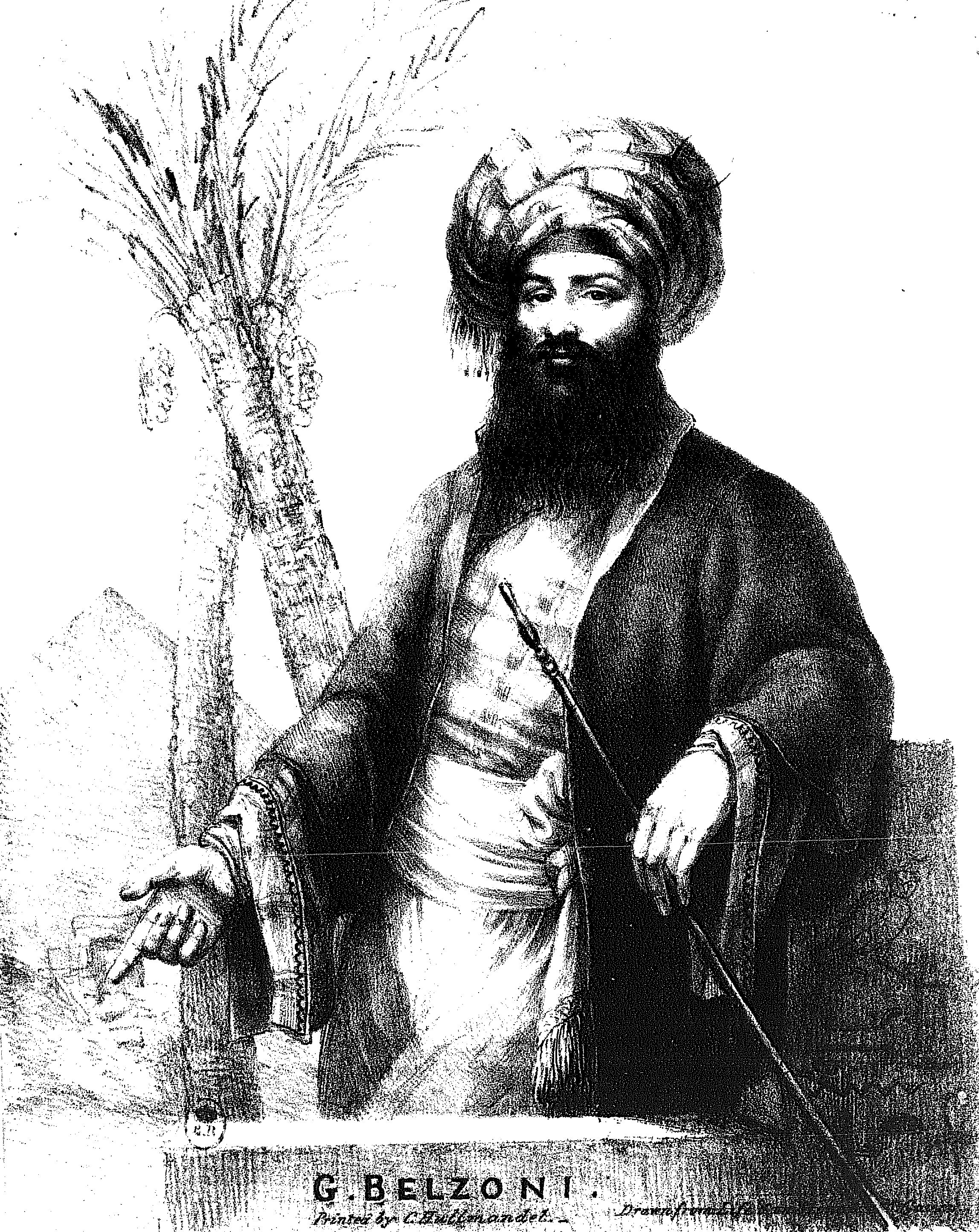
Giovanni Battista Belzoni

- November 5
  - Giovanni Battista Belzoni, Italian explorer (d. 1823)
  - Thomas Ritchie, American journalist (d. 1854)
- November 8 – Joseph Signay, Canadian Catholic bishop (d. 1850)
- November 11 – Nils Astrup, Norwegian politician (d. 1835)
- November 14
  - Heinrich Gottlieb Tzschirner, German theologian (d. 1828)
  - Johann Nepomuk Hummel, Austrian composer, virtuoso pianist (d. 1837)
- November 15
  - George Canning, 1st Baron Garvagh, British politician (d. 1840)
  - Giovanni Battista Belzoni, Italian antiquarian (d. 1823)
- November 16 – Johann Joseph von Prechtl, Austrian technologist (d. 1854)
- November 18 – Lord William Stuart, British politician (d. 1814)
- November 19 – Charles de Salaberry, Canadian politician (d. 1829)
- November 21
  - Richard Phillips, British chemist (d. 1851)
  - Thomas B. Cooke, American politician (d. 1853)
  - Joseph Warren Scott, American army officer (d. 1871)
  - Kunitomo Ikkansai, Japanese gunsmith (d. 1840)
- November 22 – Aurora Wilhelmina Koskull, Swedish lady-in-waiting, politically active salonist (d. 1852)
- November 23
  - Mariano Moreno, Argentine politician (d. 1811)
  - Samuel Humphreys, noted American naval architect and shipbuilder in the early 19th century (d. 1846)
- November 24 – Salusbury Pryce Humphreys, British Royal Navy officer during the French Revolutionary and Napoleonic Wars, and the War of 1812 (d. 1845)
- November 25
  - Joseph Lancaster, English Quaker, public education innovator (d. 1838)
  - Mary Anne Schimmelpenninck, British abolitionist (d. 1856)
- November 26
  - Jean-Thomas Taschereau, Canadian politician (d. 1832)
  - Henry Fane, British Army general (d. 1840)
- November 28
  - Filippo di Colloredo-Mels, leader of the Sovereign Military Order of Malta (d. 1864)
  - Abd al-Rahman of Morocco, Alaouite dynasty member (d. 1859)
- November 29 – Hryhorii Kvitka-Osnovianenko, Ukrainian writer, journalist, and playwright (d. 1843)
- November 30 – Andrés Guazurary, Argentine general (d. 1825)

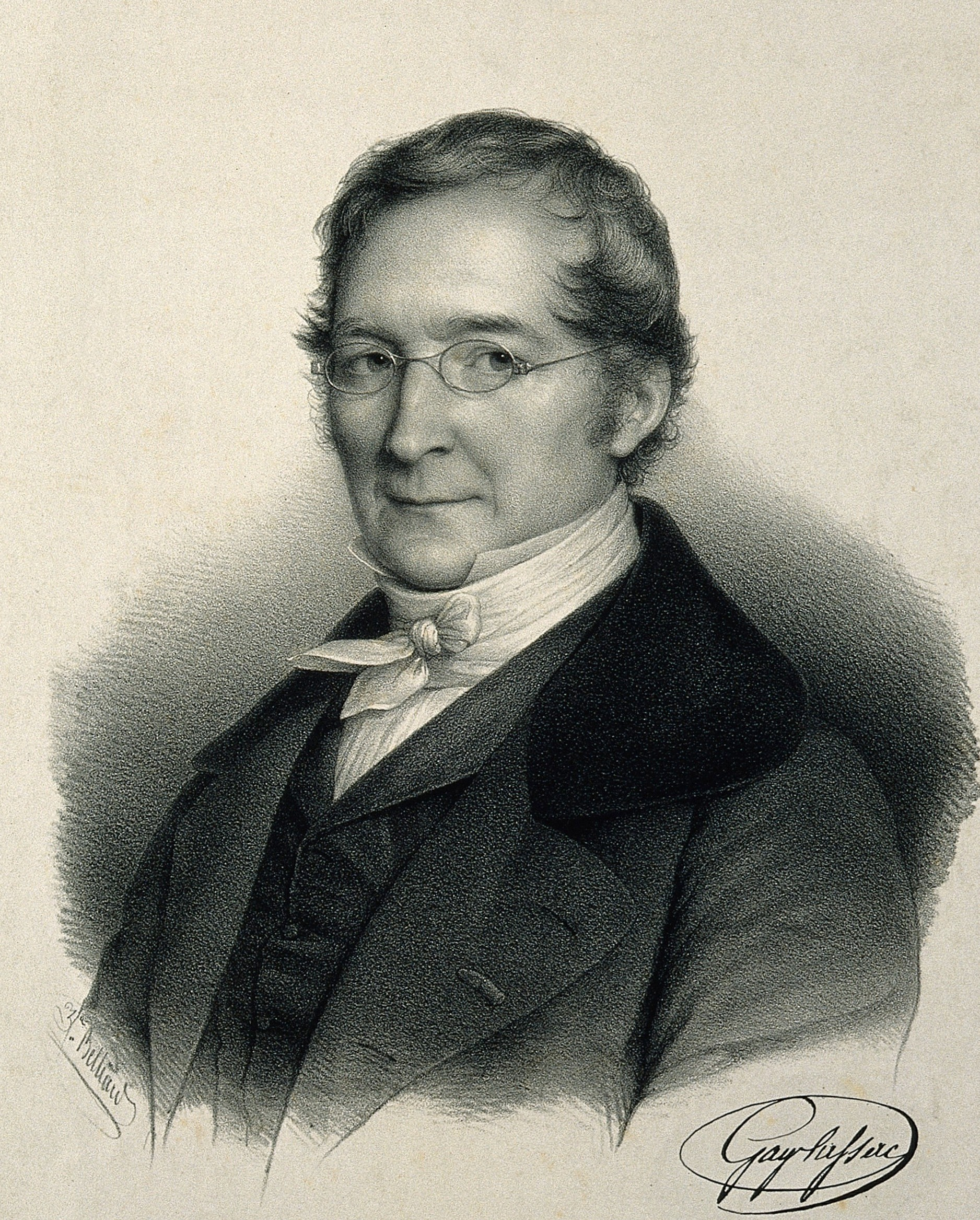
Joseph Louis Gay-Lussac

- December 6 – Joseph Louis Gay-Lussac, French chemist (d. 1850)
- December 7 – Franz Naegele, German obstetrician (d. 1851)
- December 9 – Vicente González Moreno, Spanish general (d. 1839)
- December 10 – Antonio Francesco Orioli, Italian Catholic cardinal (d. 1852)
- December 13
  - George Townshend, 3rd Marquess Townshend of Great Britain (d. 1855)
  - Thomas Kendall, New Zealand missionary (d. 1832)
- December 15
  - Godert van der Capellen, Dutch colonial governor (d. 1848)
  - Christiane Luise Amalie Becker, German actor (d. 1797)
- December 16
  - John Ordronaux, French privateer (d. 1841)
  - Ludwig Robert, German dramatist (d. 1832)
  - José Colombres, Argentine Catholic bishop (d. 1859)

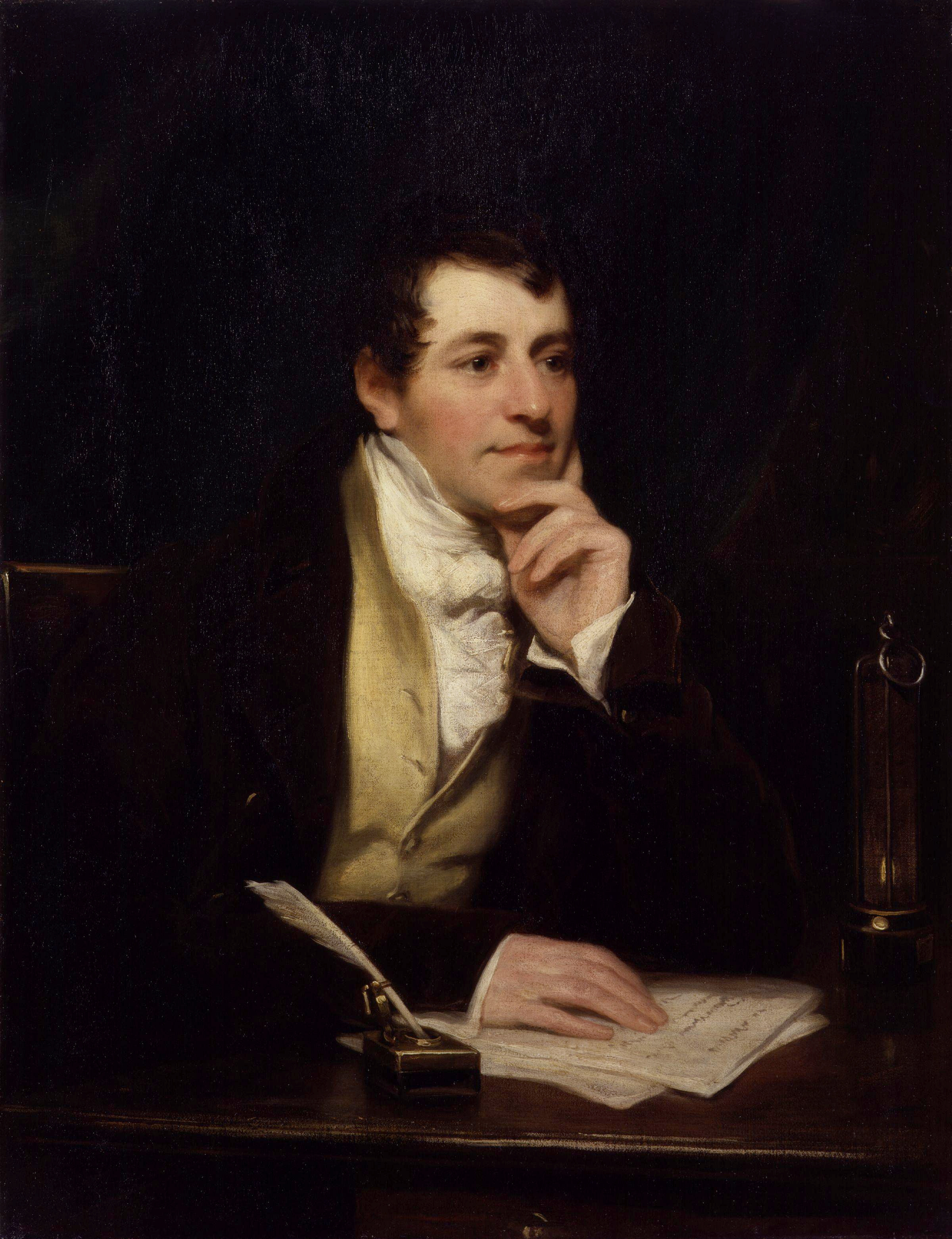
Humphry Davy

- December 17
  - Humphry Davy, English physicist, chemist (d. 1829)
  - William Munroe, American cabinet maker (d. 1861)
  - Juan Martín de Veramendi, Governor of Mexican Texas (d. 1833)

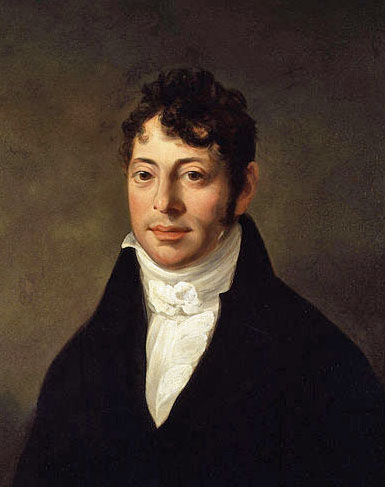
Joseph Grimaldi

- December 18 – Joseph Grimaldi, English actor and comedian (d. 1837)
- December 19 – Marie Thérèse of France, eldest child of Louis XVI and Marie Antoinette (d. 1851)
- December 20 – Thomas P. Grosvenor, American politician (d. 1817)
- December 21 – Anders Sandøe Ørsted, Danish politician (d. 1860)
- December 22 – James Haldane Stewart, British priest (d. 1854)
- December 23 – François de Robiano, Belgian politician (d. 1836)
- December 24
  - Inoue Masamoto, Japanese daimyō (d. 1858)
  - James Guyon, Jr., American politician (d. 1846)
  - Thomas Coventry, English cricketer (d. 1816)
- December 25 – Caleb Atwater, American politician (d. 1867)
- December 27 – Antoine François Eugène Merlin, French general (d. 1854)
- December 28
  - Franz Xaver Heller, German botanist (d. 1840)
  - William Cowper, English-born Anglican cleric in Australia, who was the Archdeacon of Cumberland (d. 1858)
  - Charles Hanbury-Tracy, 1st Baron Sudeley, British politician (d. 1858)
  - Matthew Arbuckle, United States soldier (d. 1851)
- December 29
  - Georg Anton Friedrich Ast, German philosopher (d. 1841)
  - Johann Simon Hermstedt, German musician (d. 1846)

=== Undated ===
- Sardar Fath 'Ali Khan, Wazir-i-azam of Kabul (d. 1818)
- Anna Maria Walker, Scottish botanist (d. 1852)
- Sara Oust, Norwegian lay minister (d. 1822)
- Marie-Madeleine Lachenais, Haitian de facto politician (d. 1843)

1779

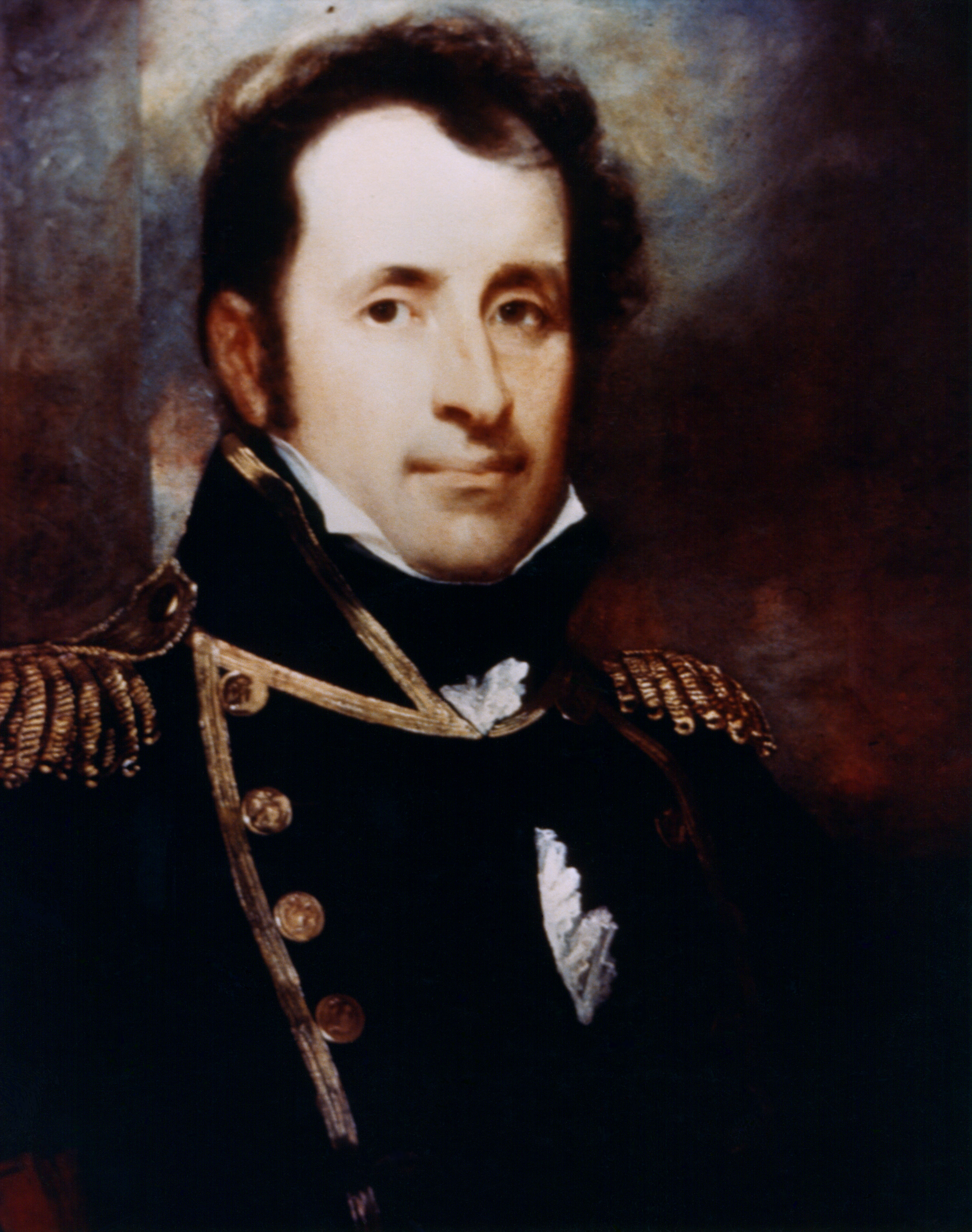
Stephen Decatur

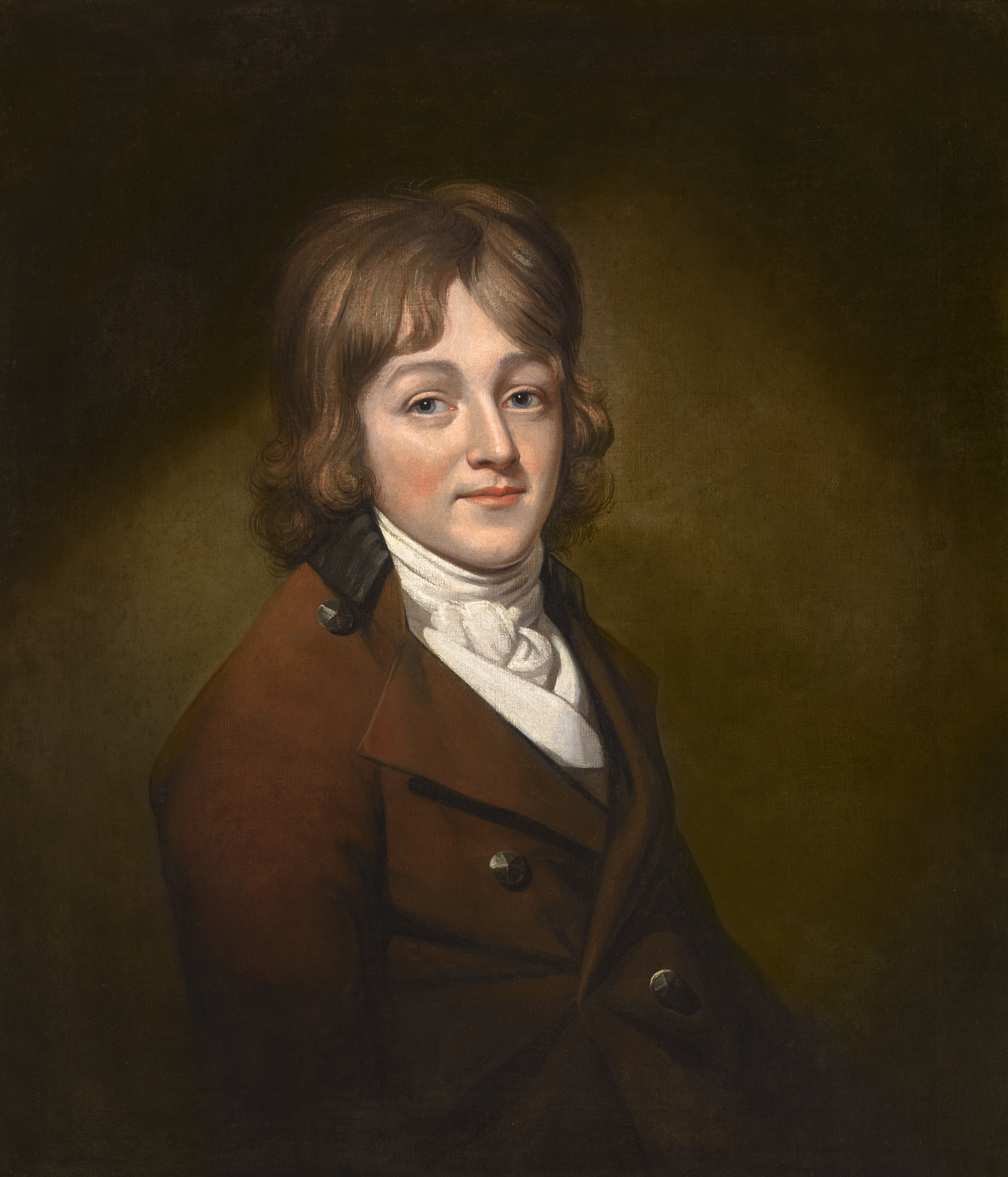
Francis Scott Key

- January 5 – Stephen Decatur, American naval officer (d. 1820)
- January 18 – Peter Mark Roget, British lexicographer (d. 1869)
- February 1 – Nikolaus von Krufft, Austrian composer and civil servant (d. 1818)
- March 6
  - Giovanni Battista Bugatti, Italian executioner (d. 1869)
  - Antoine-Henri Jomini, French general (d. 1869)
- March 15 – William Lamb, 2nd Viscount Melbourne, Prime Minister of the United Kingdom (d. 1848)
- March 21 – José Bernardo de Tagle y Portocarrero, Marquis of Torre Tagle, Peruvian soldier and politician, 2nd President of Peru (d. 1825)
- May 28 – Thomas Moore, Irish poet (d. 1852)
- June 20 – Dorothy Ann Thrupp, British psalmist, hymnwriter, translator (d. 1847)
- July 8 – Giorgio Pullicino, Maltese painter and architect (d. 1851)
- August 1 – Francis Scott Key, American lawyer, lyricist (d. 1843)
- August 8 – Benjamin Silliman, American chemist, educator and abolitionist (d. 1864)
- August 20 – Jöns Jacob Berzelius, Swedish chemist (d. 1848)
- August 29 – Jean-Auguste-Dominique Ingres, French painter (d. 1867)
- September 8 – Mustafa IV, sultan of the Ottoman Empire (d. 1808)
- September 18 – Joseph Story, Associate Justice of the Supreme Court of the United States (d. 1845)
- November 14 – Adam Gottlob Oehlenschläger, Danish poet (d. 1850)
- December 12 – Madeleine Sophie Barat, French Catholic saint, founder of the Society of the Sacred Heart (d. 1865)
- December 24 – George Washington Lafayette
- date unknown – Giacomo Beltrami, Italian explorer (d. 1855)

== Deaths ==
1770

- January 7 – Carl Gustaf Tessin, Swedish politician (b. 1695)
- January 8 – John Michael Rysbrack, Flemish sculptor (b. 1694)
- January 20 – Charles Yorke, Lord Chancellor of Great Britain (b. 1722)
- January 27 – Johann Karl Philipp von Cobenzl, 18th-century politician (b. 1712)
- January 30 – Giovanni Pietro Francesco Agius de Soldanis, Maltese linguist, historian and cleric (b. 1712)
- January 27 – Philippe Macquer, French historian (b. 1720)
- February 26 – Giuseppe Tartini, Italian composer, violinist (b. 1692)
- March 5 – Crispus Attucks, African-American dockworker, first to die in the Boston Massacre (b. 1723)
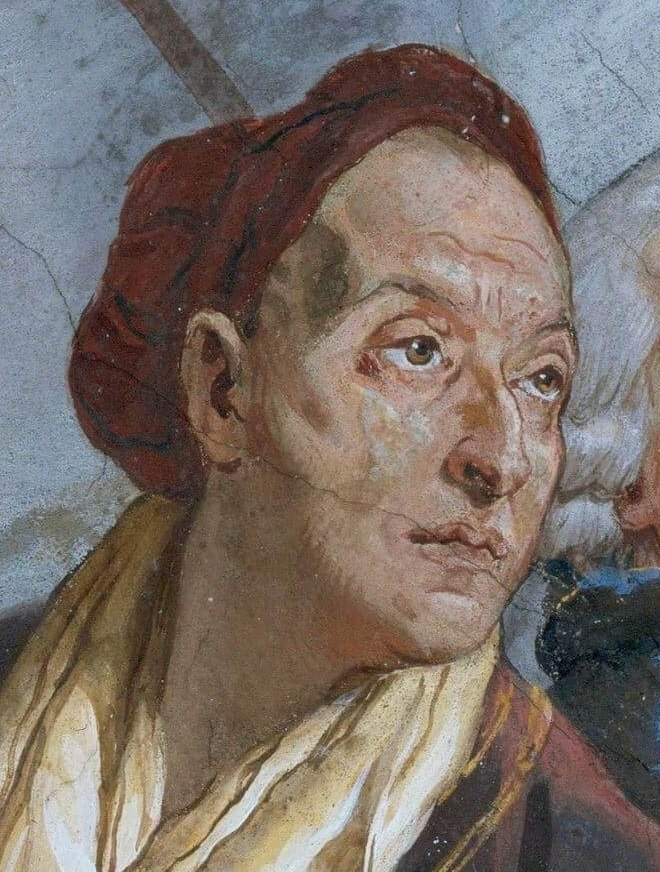
- Giovanni Battista Tiepolo
  March 27 – Giovanni Battista Tiepolo, Venetian artist (b. 1696)
- April 27 – José Solís Folch de Cardona, Spanish colonial governor (b. 1716)
- April 25 – Jean-Antoine Nollet, French abbot, physicist (b. 1700)
- May 30 – François Boucher, French painter (b. 1703)
- June 22 – Philip Carteret Webb, English barrister (b. 1702)
- June 23 – Mark Akenside, English poet, physician (b. 1721)
- July 17 – Joseph Paris Duverney, French banker (b. 1684)
- July 21 – Charlotta Frölich, Swedish agronomist (b. 1698)
- July 27 – Robert Dinwiddie, British colonial Governor of Virginia (b. 1693)
- August 15 – Edward Antill (colonial politician), American winemaker (b. 1701)
- August 24 – Thomas Chatterton, English poet (b. 1752)
- September 2 – Hongzhou, Manchu prince of the Qing Dynasty (b. 1712)
- September 9 – Bernhard Siegfried Albinus, German anatomist (b. 1697)
- September 22 – Ignatius of Santhià, Italian Catholic priest (b. 1686)

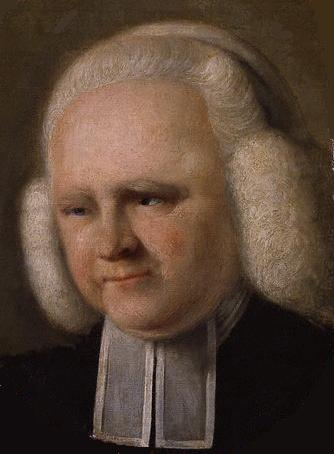
George Whitefield

- September 30
  - George Whitefield, English-born Methodist leader (b. 1714)
  - Thomas Robinson, 1st Baron Grantham, English politician and diplomat (b. c. 1695)
- October 14 – Benning Wentworth, colonial governor of New Hampshire (b. 1696)
- October 18 – John Manners, Marquess of Granby, British soldier (b. 1721)
- October 24 – William Bartram, American scientist and politician (b. 1711)
- November 9 – John Campbell, 4th Duke of Argyll, Scottish politician (b. c. 1693)
- November 13 – George Grenville, Prime Minister of Great Britain (b. 1712)
- November 24 – Charles-Jean-François Hénault, French historian (b. 1685)
- December 4 – John Perceval, 2nd Earl of Egmont, Irish politician (b. 1711)
- December 5 – James Stirling, Scottish mathematician (b. 1692)
- December 6 – Neri Maria Corsini, Italian Catholic priest and cardinal (b. 1685)

1771

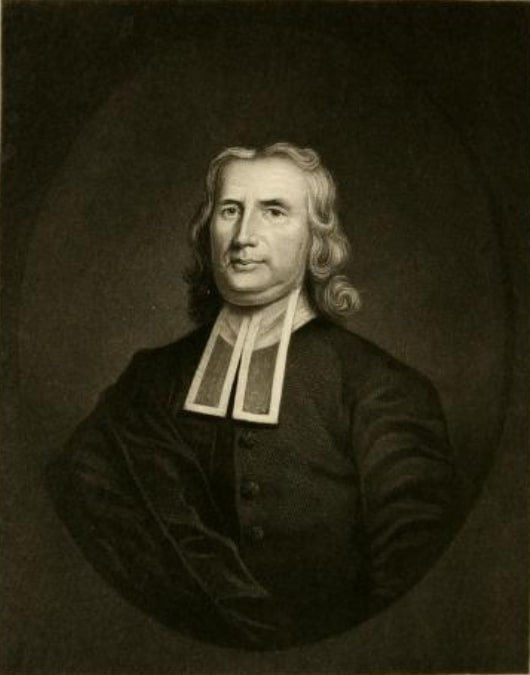
Rev. Samuel Phillips

- January 5 – John Russell, 4th Duke of Bedford, British statesman (b. 1710)
- January 11 – Jean-Baptiste de Boyer, Marquis d'Argens, French writer (b. 1704)
- January 23 – Jean Charles de Saint-Nectaire, French general (b. 1685)
- February 12 – Adolf Frederick, King of Sweden (b. 1710)
- February 20 – Jean-Jacques d'Ortous de Mairan, French geophysicist (b. 1678)
- March 12 – Louis August le Clerc, French-born sculptor (b. 1688)
- March 20 – Louis-Michel van Loo, French painter (b. 1707)

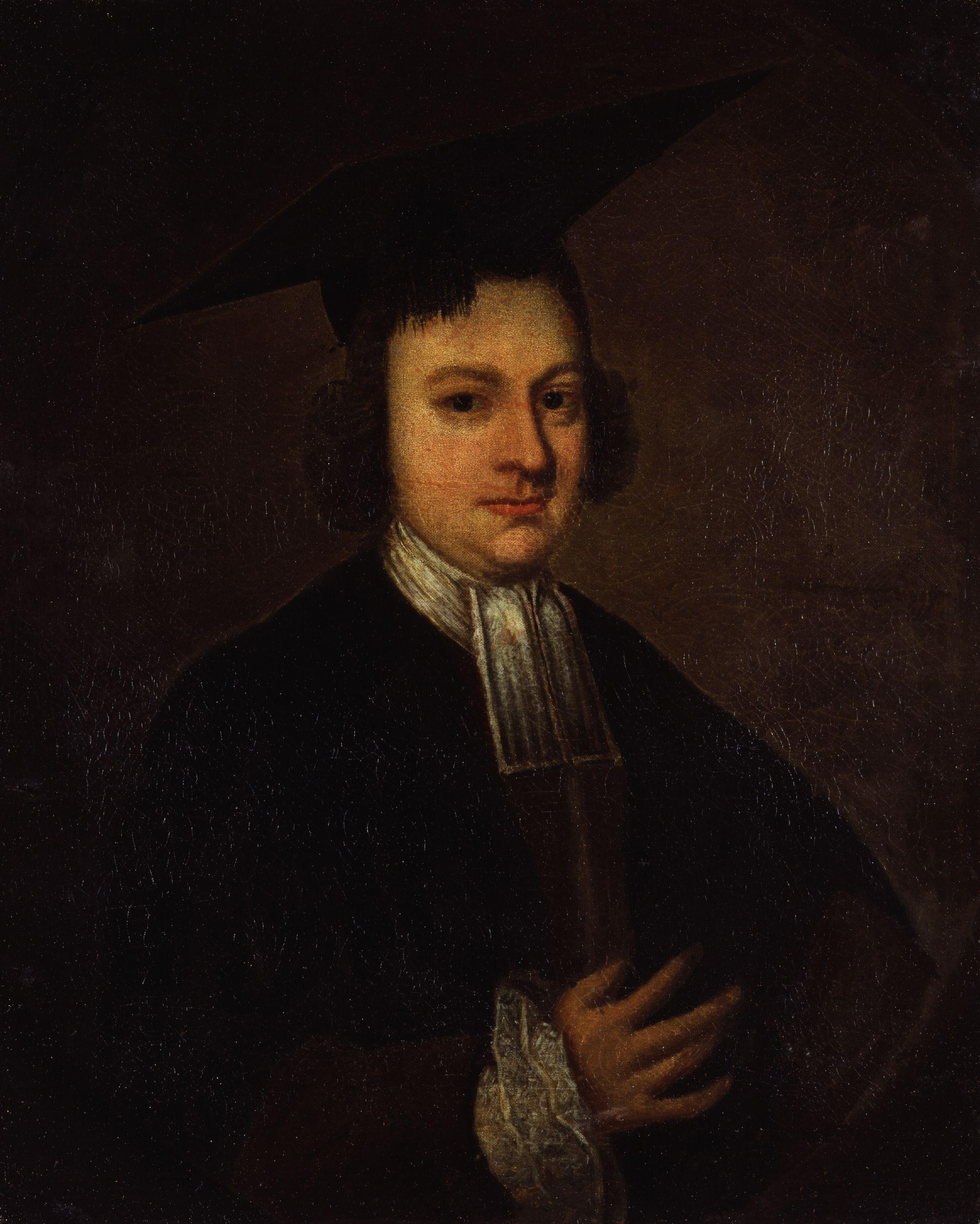
Christopher Smart

- May 21 – Christopher Smart, English poet (b. 1722)
- May 27 – Anthony Ashley Cooper, 4th Earl of Shaftesbury, English philanthropist (b. 1711)
- June 5 – Samuel Phillips (reverend), colonial American minister, 1st Pastor of the South Church in Andover (b. 1690)
- June 8 – George Montagu-Dunk, 2nd Earl of Halifax, English statesman (b. 1716)
- July 14 – Chen Hongmou, Chinese scholar and philosopher (b. 1696)
- July 22 – William Whitmore (British Army officer), British general (b. 1714)
- July 30 – Thomas Gray, English writer (b. 1716)
- September 13 – John Gambold, British bishop (b. 1711)
- September 17 – Tobias Smollett, Scottish novelist (b. 1721)
- October 31 – Charles-Nicolas d'Oultremont, Roman Catholic bishop (b. 1716)
- November 4 – Charles Lucas (politician), Irish apothecary (b. 1713)
- November 6 – John Bevis, English physician, astronomer (b. 1695)
- November 13 – Konrad Ernst Ackermann, German actor (b. 1712)

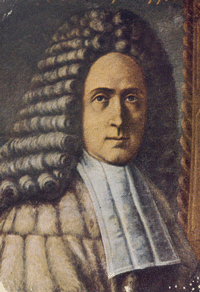
Giovanni Battista Morgagni

- December 6 – Giovanni Battista Morgagni, Italian anatomist (b. 1682)
- December 23 – Marie-Marguerite d'Youville, Canadian saint (b. 1701)
- December 26 – Claude Adrien Helvétius, French philosopher (b. 1715)
- December 27 – Henri Pitot, Italian-born French engineer (b. 1695)

1772

- February 4 – Princess Victoria Charlotte of Anhalt-Zeitz-Hoym, Margravine of Brandenburg-Bayreuth (b. 1715)
- February 8 – Princess Augusta of Saxe-Gotha, Princess of Wales (b. 1719)
- February 11 – Caterina Sagredo Barbarigo, Venetian aristocrat and salon holder (b. 1715)
- February 15 – Mitromaras, Greek rebel and pirate
- February 18 – Count Johann Hartwig Ernst von Bernstorff, Danish statesman (b. 1712)
- February 20 – Princess Maria Theresia of Liechtenstein (b. 1694)
- March 21 – Jacques-Nicolas Bellin, French cartographer (b. 1703)
- March 22 – John Canton, English physicist (b. 1718)
- March 26 – Charles Pinot Duclos, French writer (b. 1704)
- March 27 – Taylor White, British judge (b. 1701)

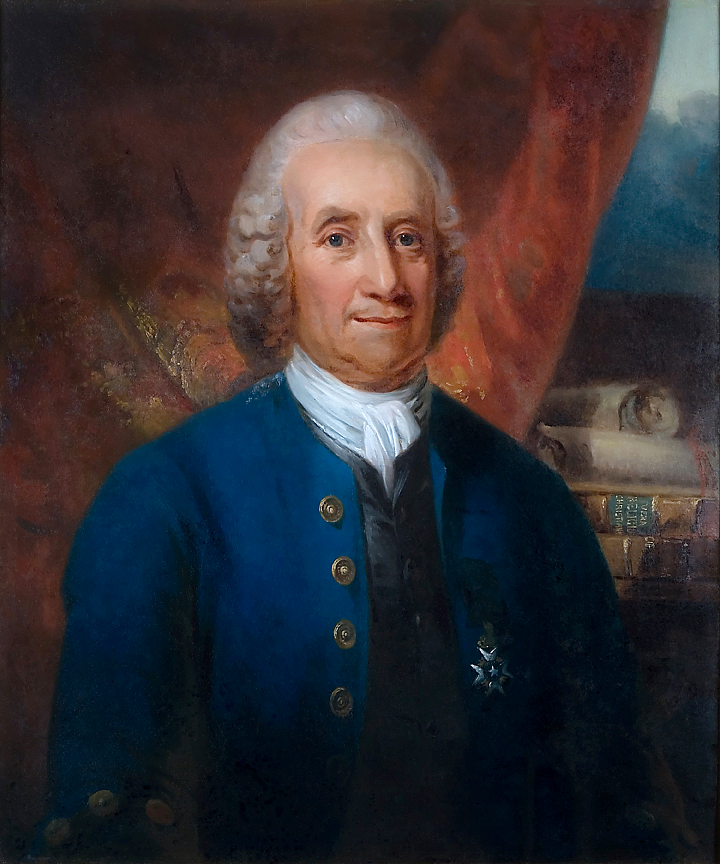
Emanuel Swedenborg

- March 29 – Emanuel Swedenborg, Swedish philosopher and mathematician (b. 1688)
- April 28 – Johann Friedrich Struensee, Danish royal physician and de facto regent, executed (b. 1737)
- May 1 – Gottfried Achenwall, German statistician (b. 1719)
- May 22 – Durastante Natalucci, Italian historian (b. 1687)
- June 15 – Louis-Claude Daquin, French composer (b. 1694)
- June 18
  - Gerard van Swieten, Dutch-born Austrian physician (b. 1700)
  - Johann Ulrich von Cramer, German judge, philosopher (b. 1706)
- June 22 – François-Vincent Toussaint, French writer most famous for Les Mœurs (The Manners) (b. 1715)
- August 31 – William Borlase, English naturalist (b. 1695)
- September 30 – James Brindley, English canal builder (b. 1716)
- October 7 – John Woolman, American Quaker preacher, abolitionist (b. 1720)

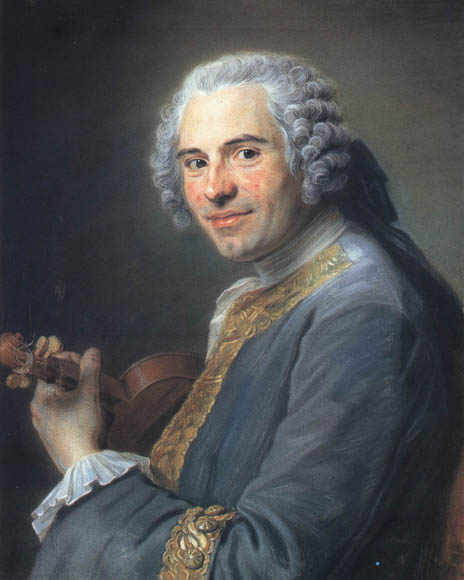
Jean-Joseph de Mondonville

- October 8 – Jean-Joseph de Mondonville, French violinist, composer (b. 1711)
- October 14 – Benjamin Green, Canadian merchant and judge (b. 1713)
- October 16 – Ahmad Shah Durrani, Afghan founder of the Durrani Empire (cancer) (b. 1724)
- October 19 – Andrea Belli, Maltese architect, businessman (b. 1703)
- November 10 – Pedro Antonio Joaquim Correa da Serra Garção, Portuguese poet (b. 1724)
- November 18 – Madhavrao I, ruler of India (b. 1745)
- November 19 – William Nelson, American colonial governor of Virginia (b. 1711)
- December 4 – Dov Ber of Mezeritch, the Great Maggid, a preacher and founder of Hasidism.
- December 7 – Martín Sarmiento, Spanish writer, scholar (b. 1695)
- date unknown – Panna Cinka, Hungarian violinist (b. 1711)

1773

- January 1 – Sir Richard Glyn, 1st Baronet, of Ewell, Lord Mayor of London (b. 1711)
- January 12 – Jacob von Eggers, Military engineer (b. 1704)
- January 21 – Alexis Piron, French writer (b. 1689)
- January 23
  - Manuel Pinto da Fonseca, 68th Grandmaster of the Knights Hospitaller (b. 1681)
  - Pieter van Reede van Oudtshoorn, Dutch administrator of the Cape Colony (b. 1714)
- February 20 – King Charles Emmanuel III of Sardinia (b. 1701)
- March 1 – Luigi Vanvitelli, Italian architect (b. 1700)

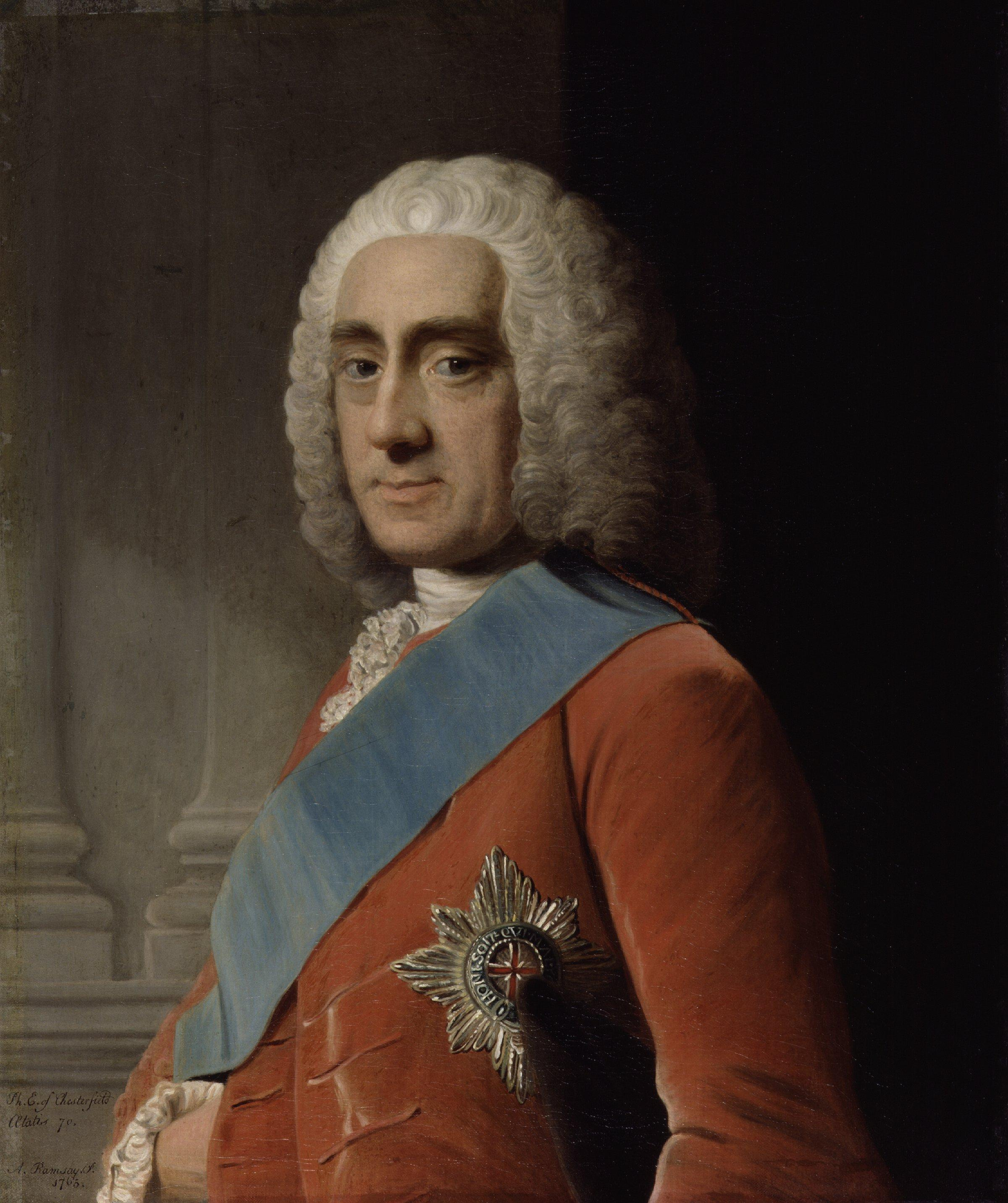
Philip Stanhope, 4th Earl of Chesterfield

- March 24
  - Stephen Leake, English numismatist, officer of arms at the College of Arms in London (b. 1702)
  - Philip Stanhope, 4th Earl of Chesterfield, English statesman and man of letters (b. 1694)
- March 20 – Gottlieb Heinrich Totleben, German noble (b. 1715)
- May 8 – Ali Bey Al-Kabir, Mamluk Sultan of Egypt (b. 1728)
- May 15 – Alban Butler, English Catholic priest, writer (b. 1710)
- May 28 – John Wayles, American lawyer and planter (b. 1715)
- June 21 – Jorge Juan y Santacilia, Spanish geodesist (b. 1713)
- June 27 – Mentewab, dowager Empress of Ethiopia (b. c. 1706)
- July 5 – Francisco José Freire, Portuguese historian, philologist (b. 1719)
- July 12 – Johann Joachim Quantz, German flutist, composer (b. 1697)
- July 23 – George Edwards, English ornithologist and naturalist (b. 1694)
- July 25 – Axel Löwen, Swedish duke (b. 1686)
- August 3 – Stanisław Konarski, Polish writer (b. 1700)
- August 19
  - Burkat Shudi, English harpsichord maker (b. 1702)
  - Francesco Zahra, Maltese painter (b. 1710)
- August 20 – Enrique Florez, Spanish historian (b. 1701)
- September 23 – Johan Ernst Gunnerus, Norwegian bishop and botanist (b. 1718)
- October 14 – Septimanie d'Egmont, French salonist (b. 1740)
- October 30 – Philippe de La Guêpière, French architect (b. 1725)
- November 2 – John Glas, Scottish minister (b. 1695)
- November 7 – Princess Anne Charlotte of Lorraine, French royal (b. 1714)

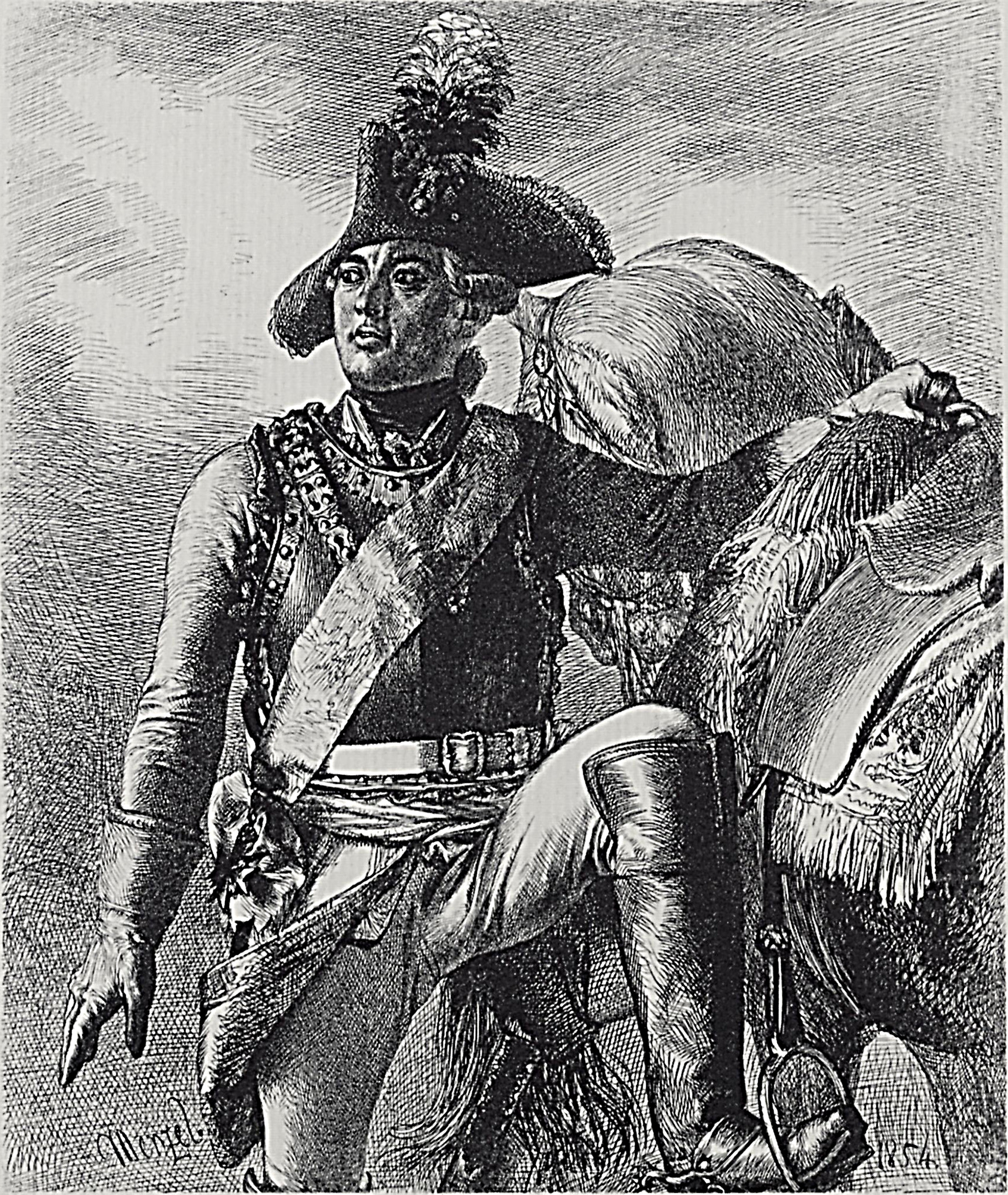
Friedrich Wilhelm von Seydlitz

- November 8 – Friedrich Wilhelm von Seydlitz, Prussian general (b. 1721)
- November 16 – John Hawkesworth, English writer (b. c. 1715)
- November 19 – James FitzGerald, 1st Duke of Leinster, Irish politician (b. 1722)

=== Full date unknown ===
- Bjarni Halldórsson, Icelandic legal figure and theologian (b. c. 1703)

1774

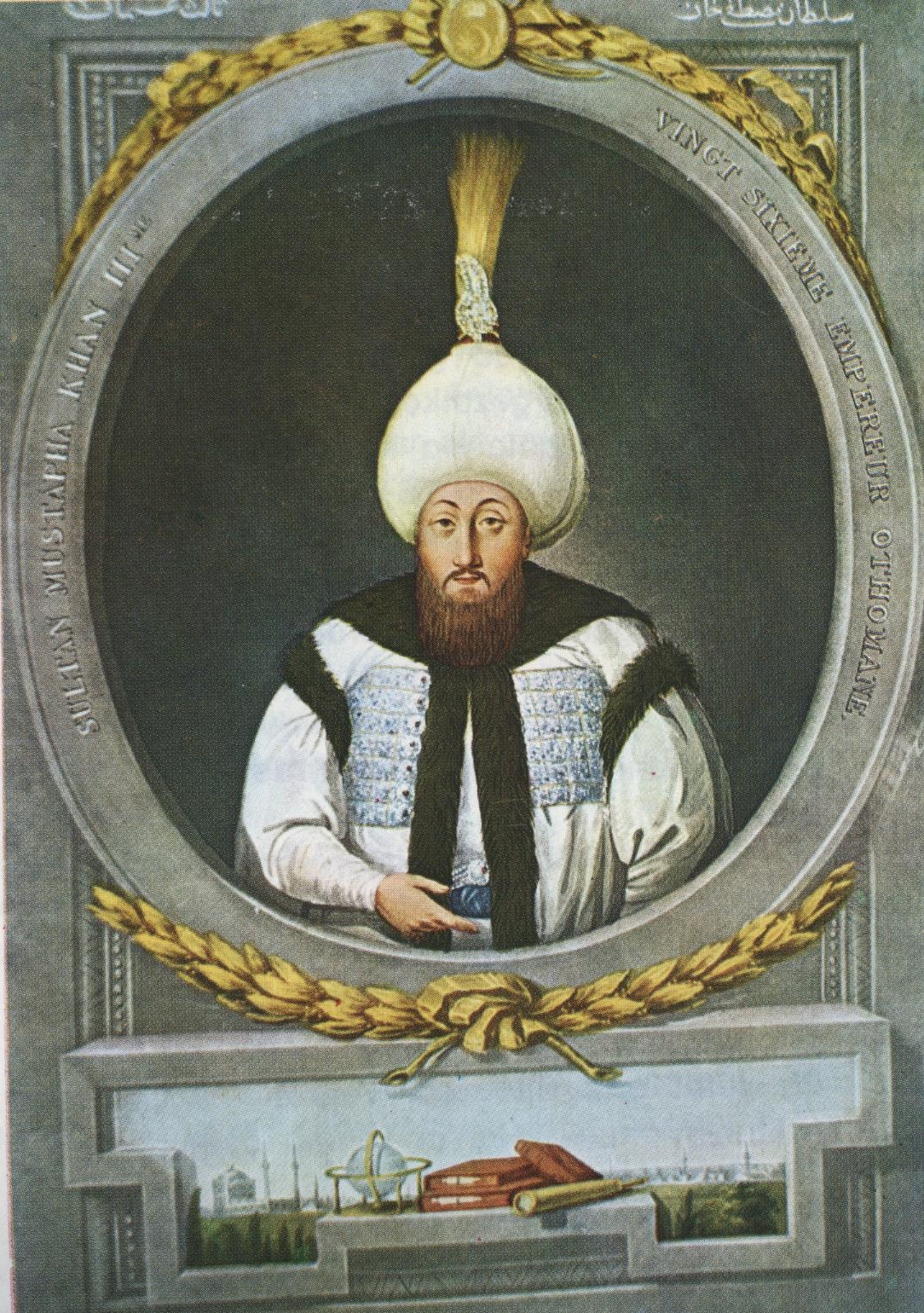
Mustafa III died 21 January

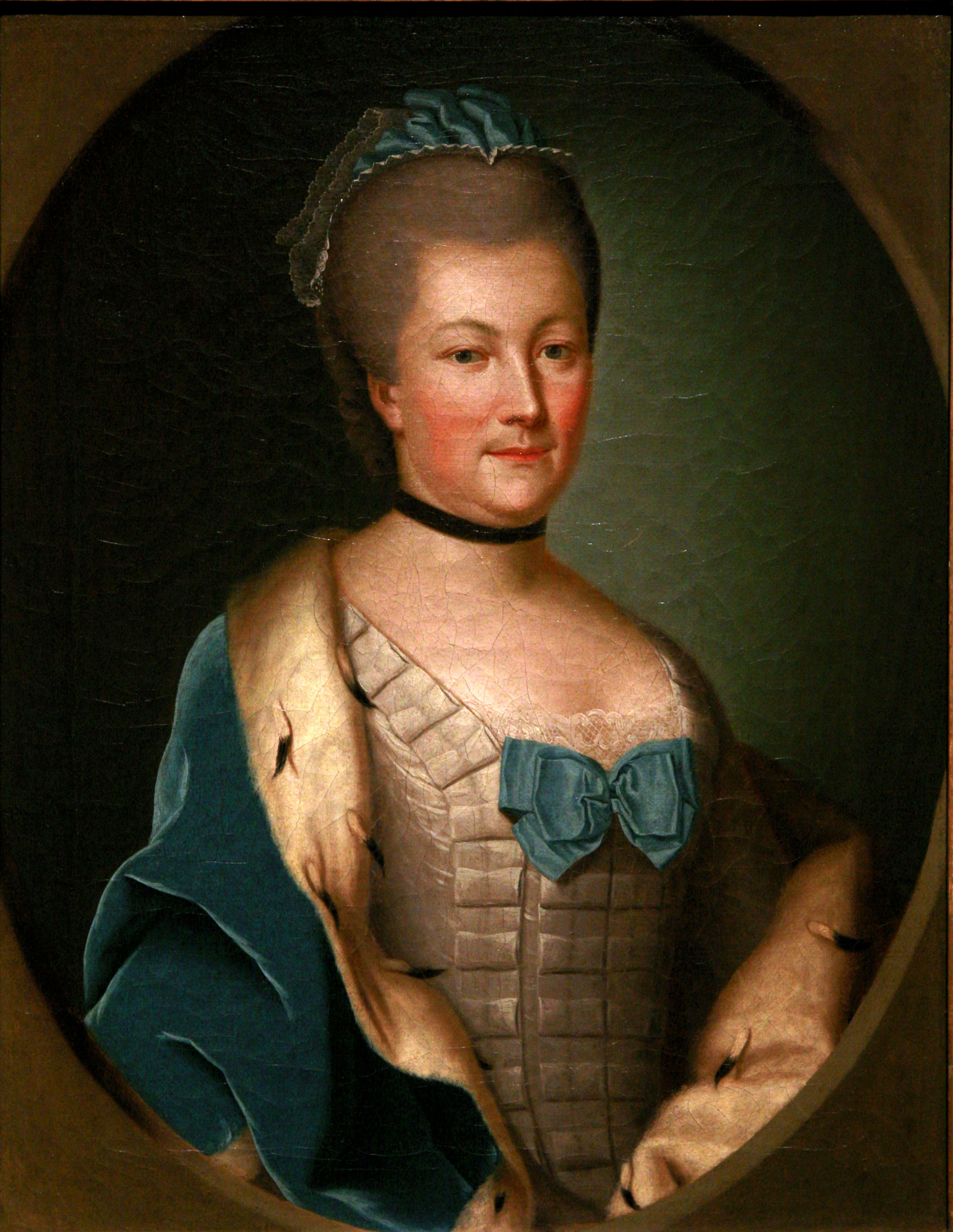
Countess Palatine Caroline of Zweibrücken died 30 March

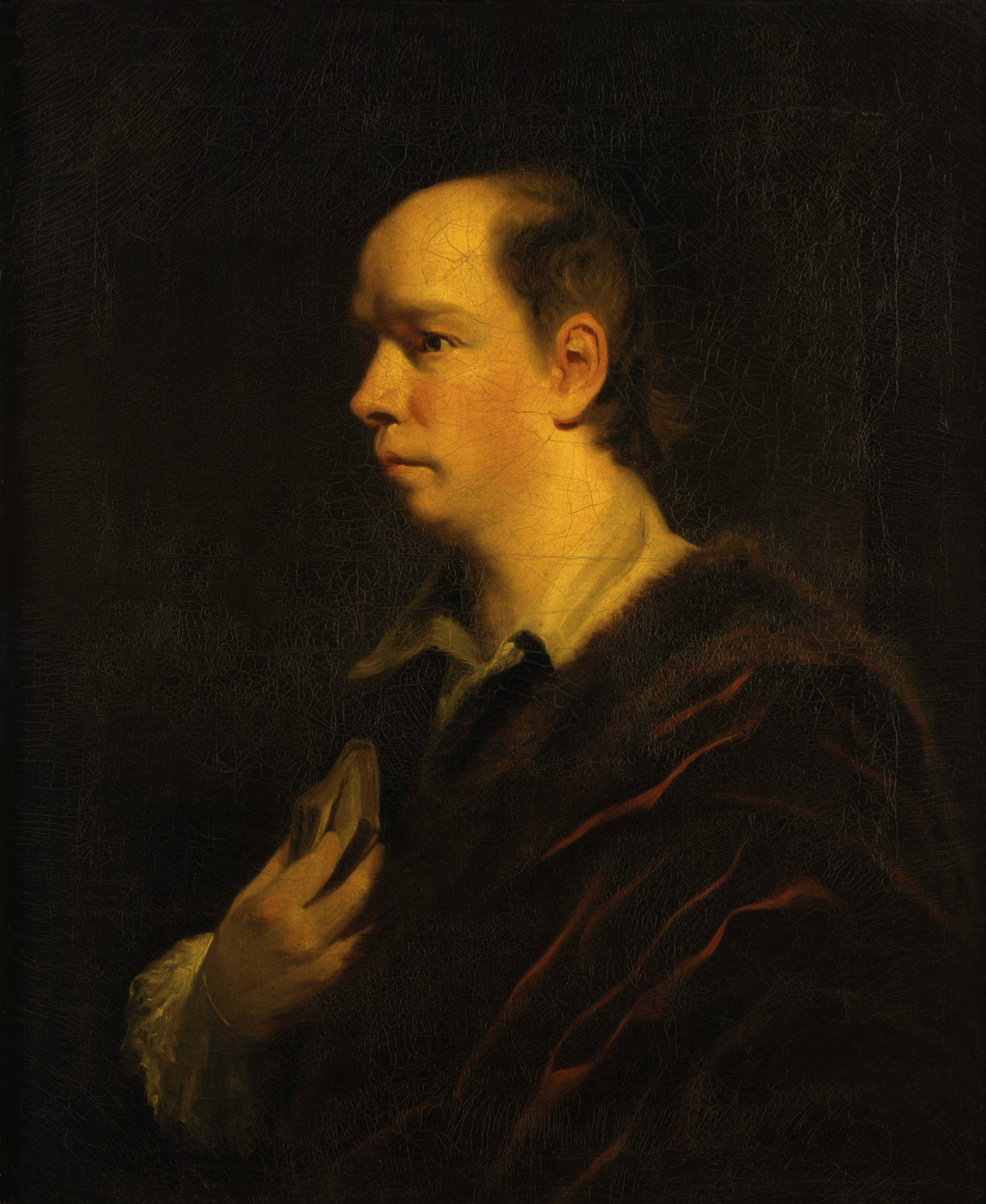
Oliver Goldsmith died 4 April

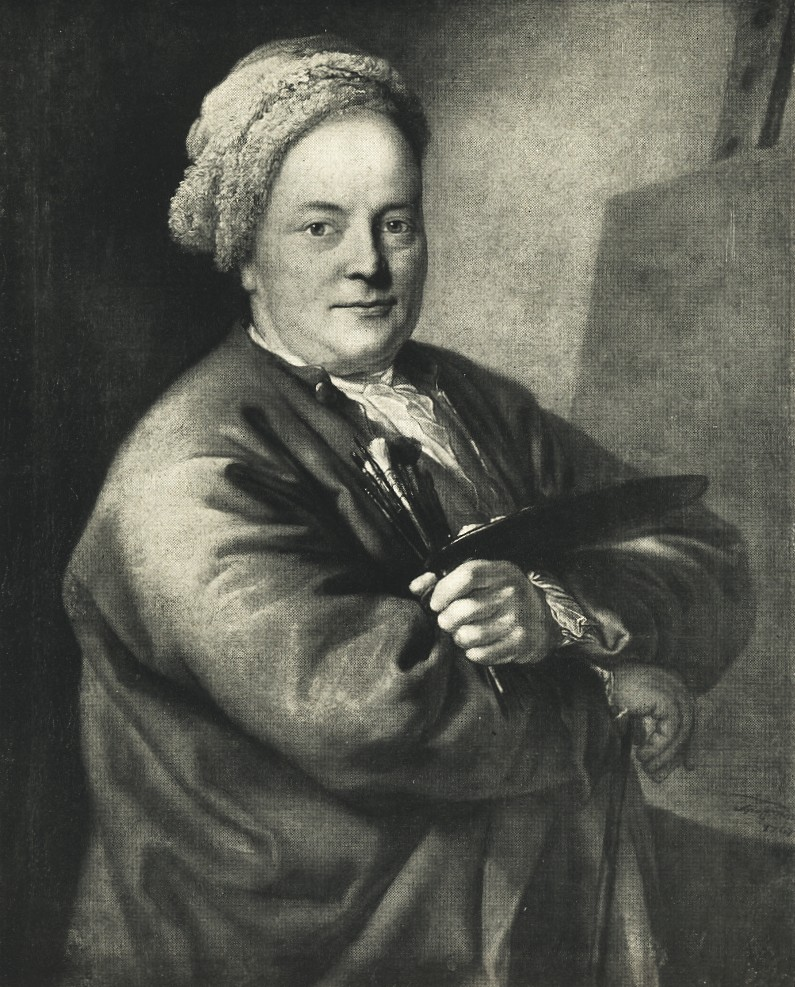
Christian Wilhelm Ernst Dietrich died 23 April

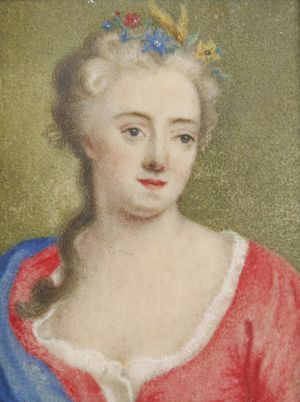
Maria Machteld van Sypesteyn died 26 April

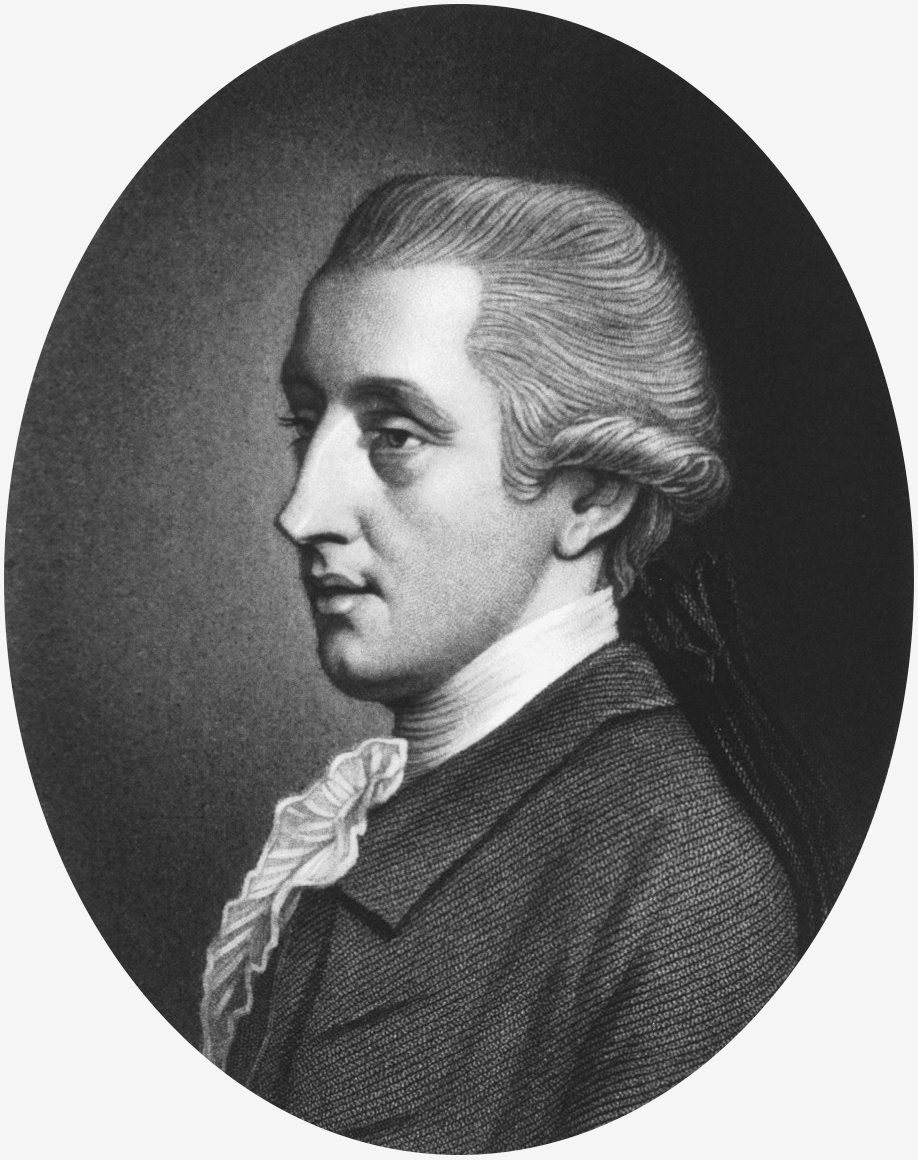
William Hewson died 1 May

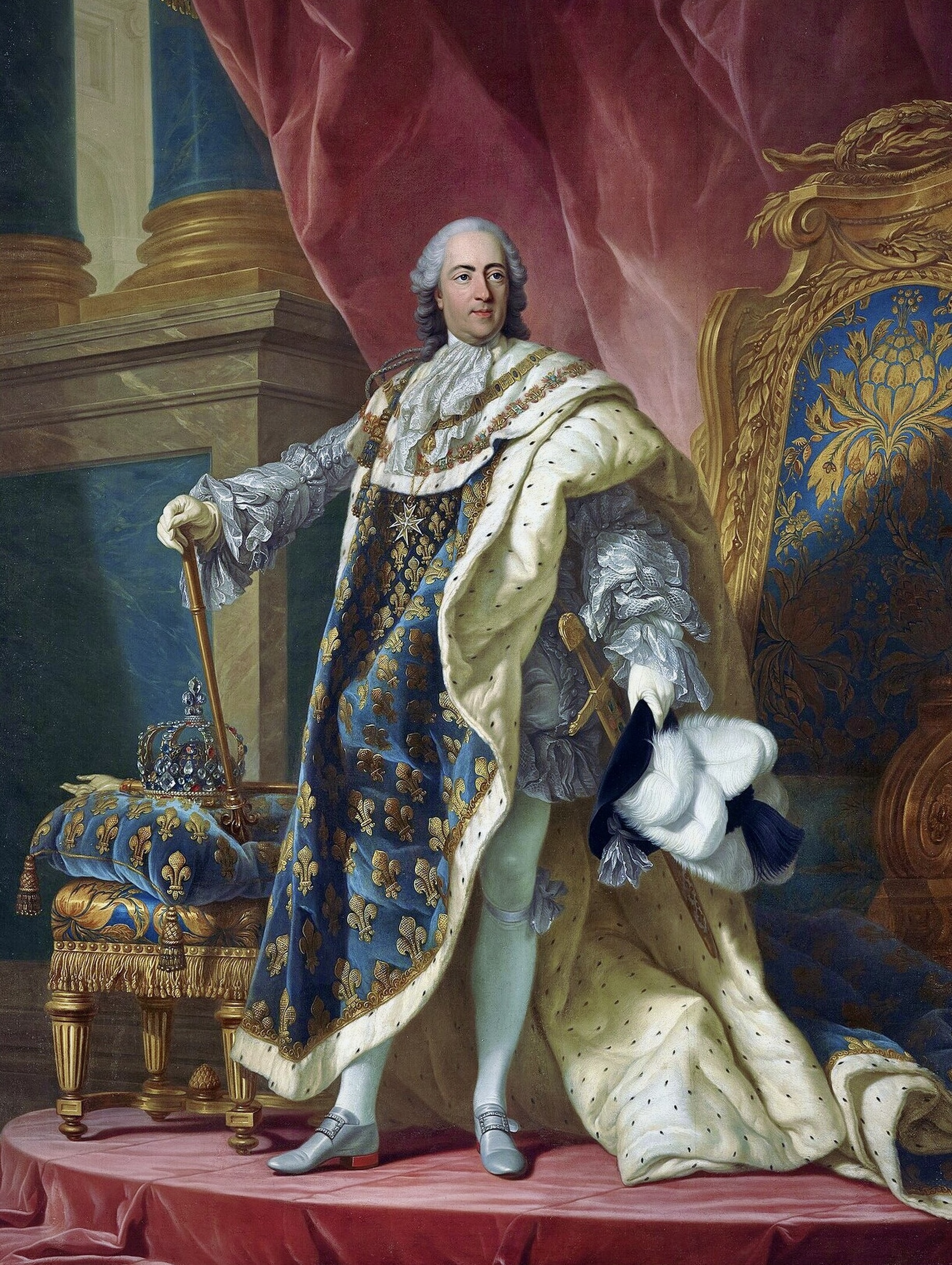
Louis XV died 10 May

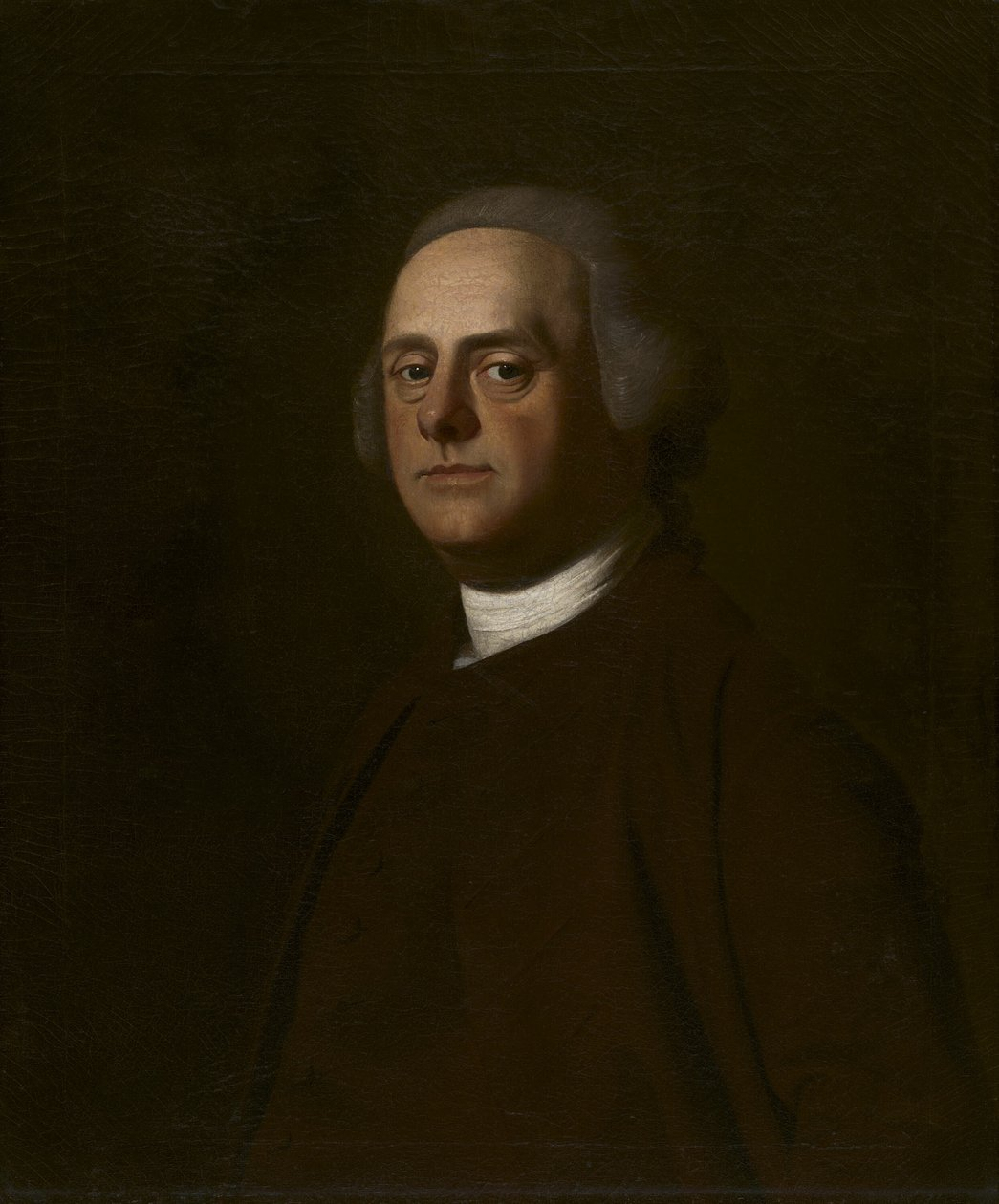
Joseph Gerrish died 3 June

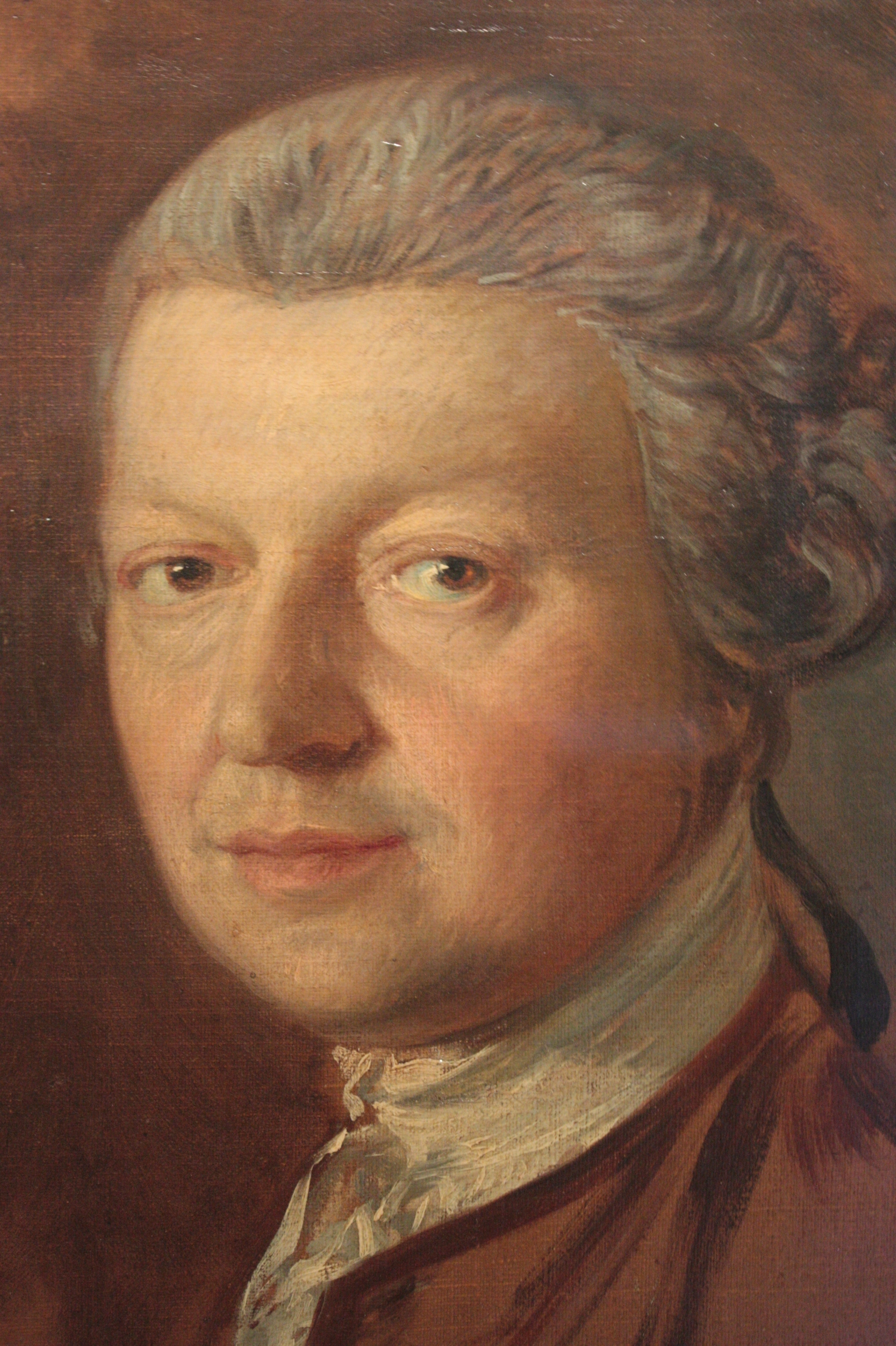
Joshua Kirby died 20 June

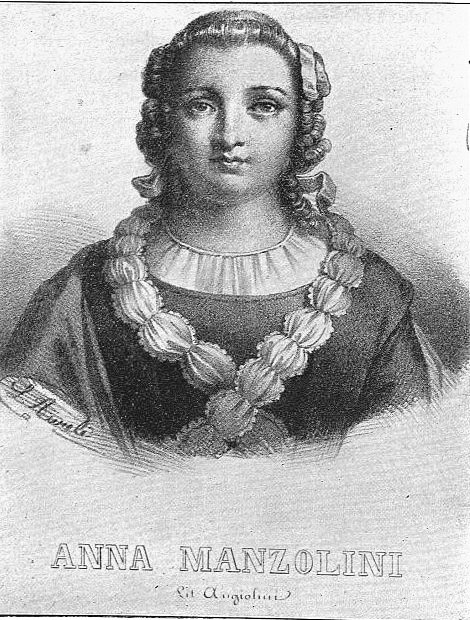
Anna Morandi Manzolini died 9 July

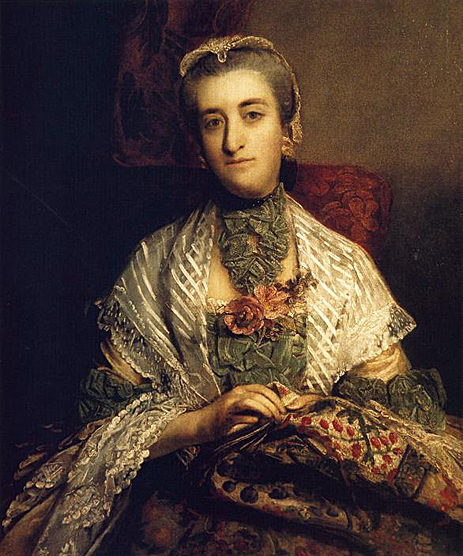
Caroline Fox, 1st Baroness Holland died 24 July

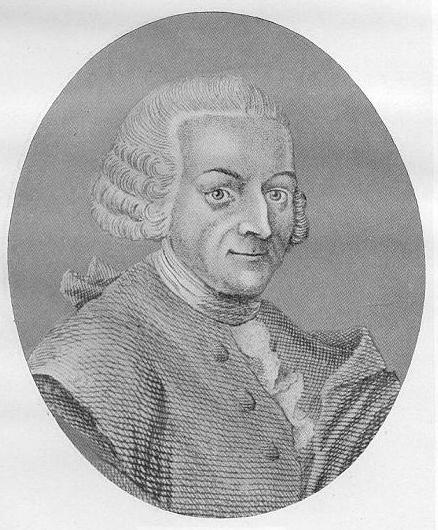
Johann Jakob Reiske died 14 August

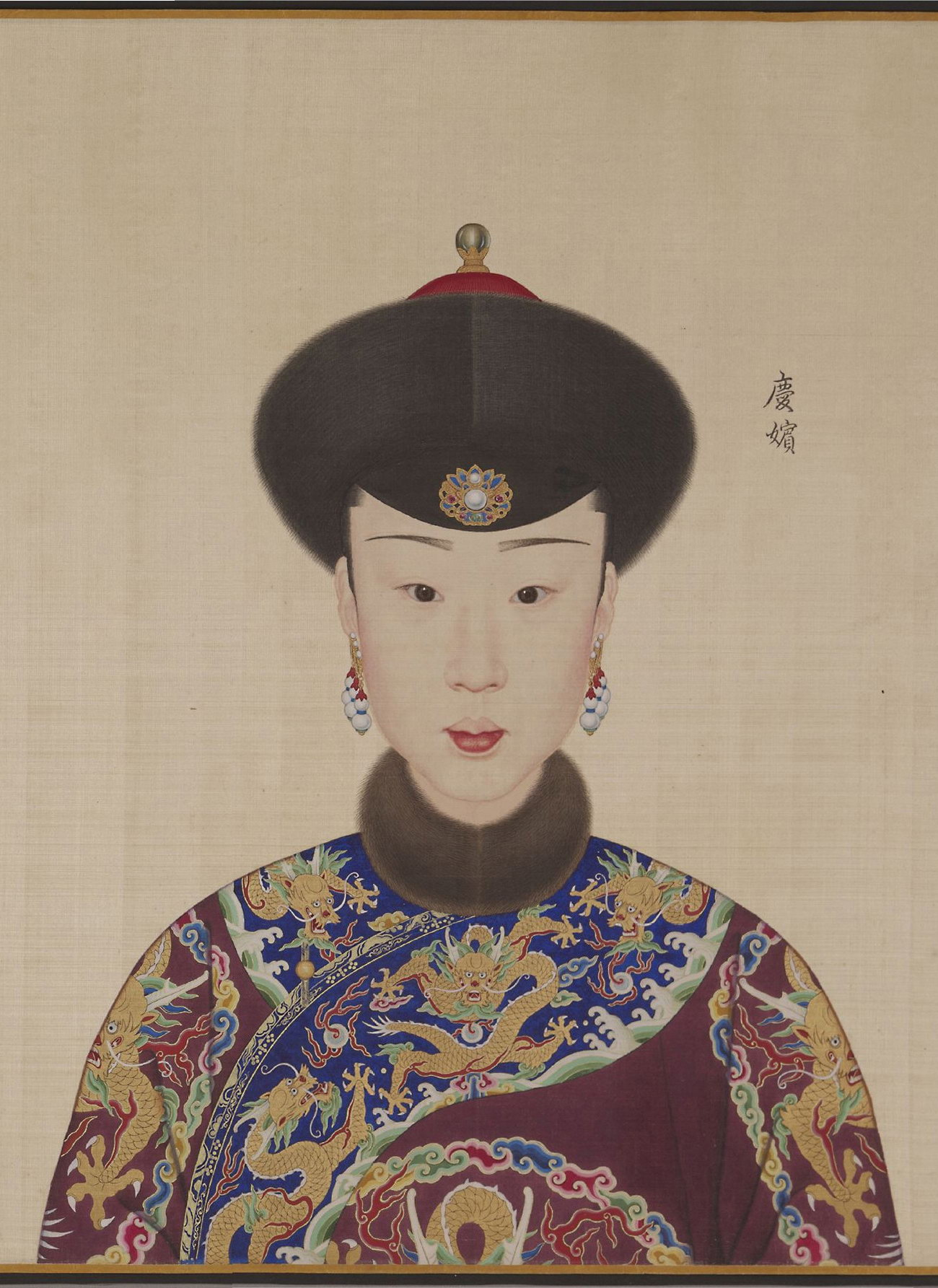
Imperial Noble Consort Qinggong died 21 August

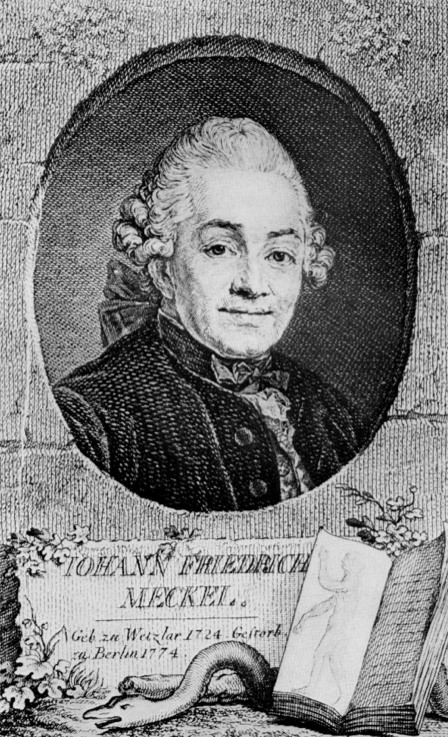
Johann Friedrich Meckel, the Elder died 18 September

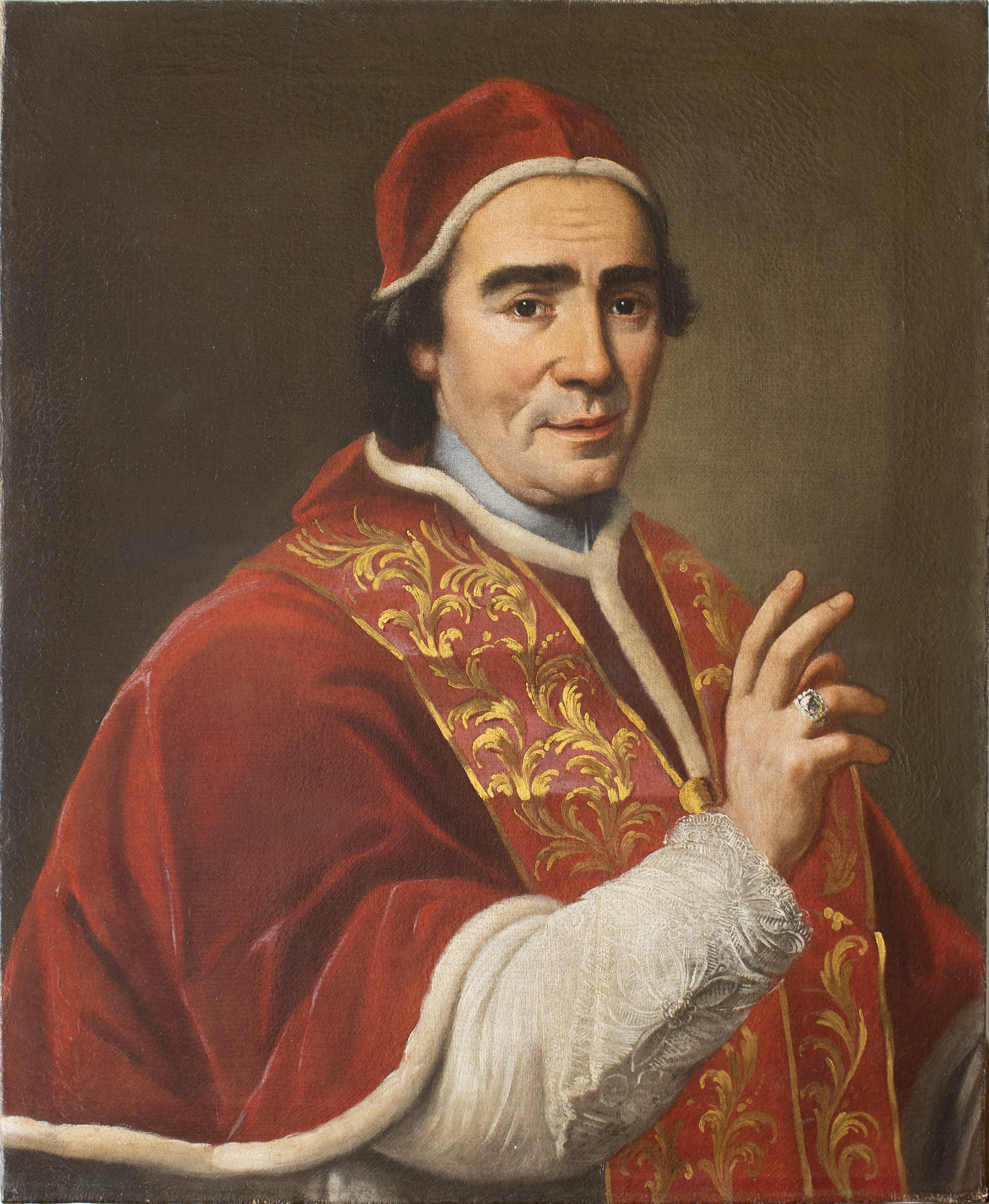
Pope Clement XIV died 22 September

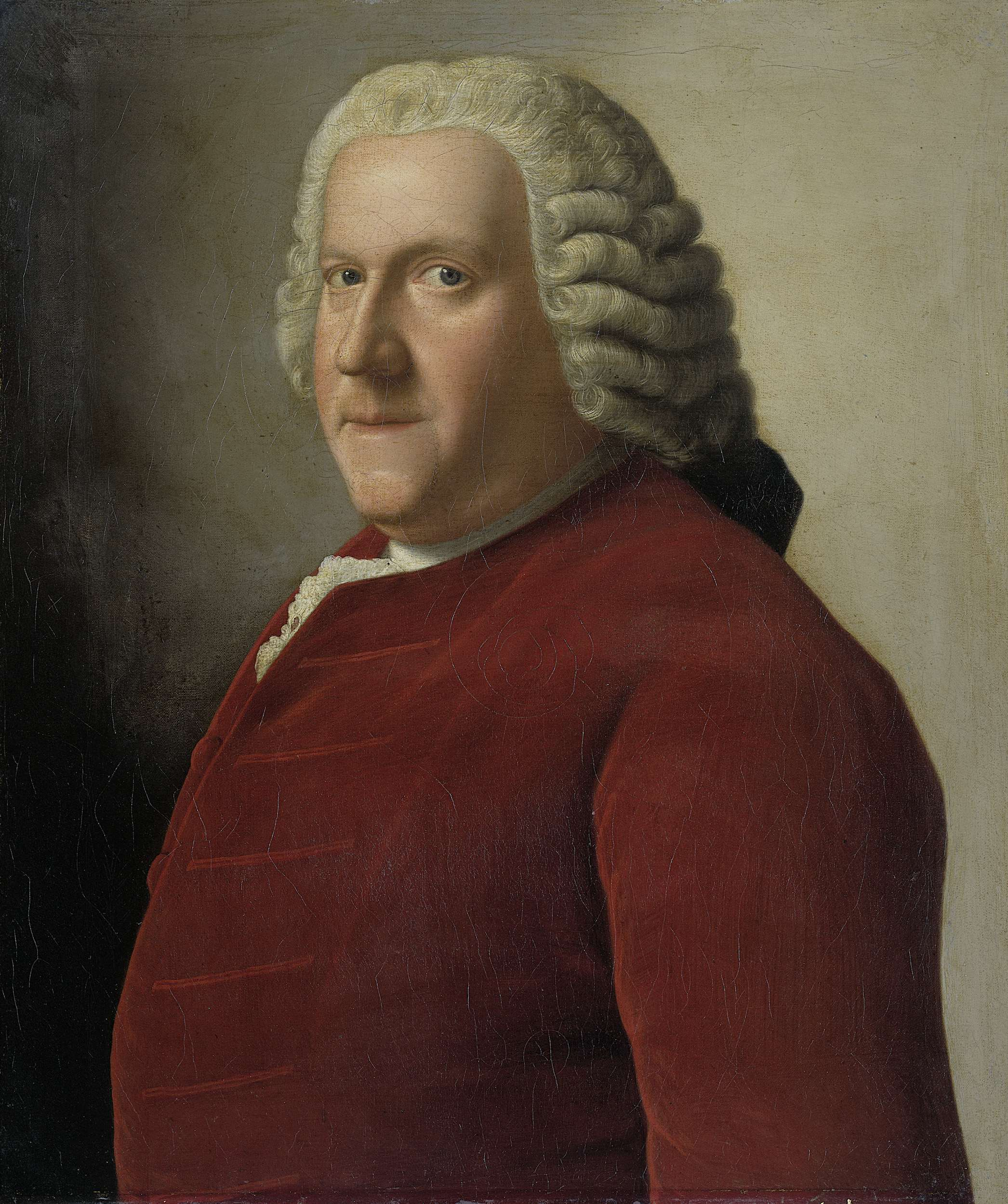
Willem Bentinck van Rhoon died 13 October

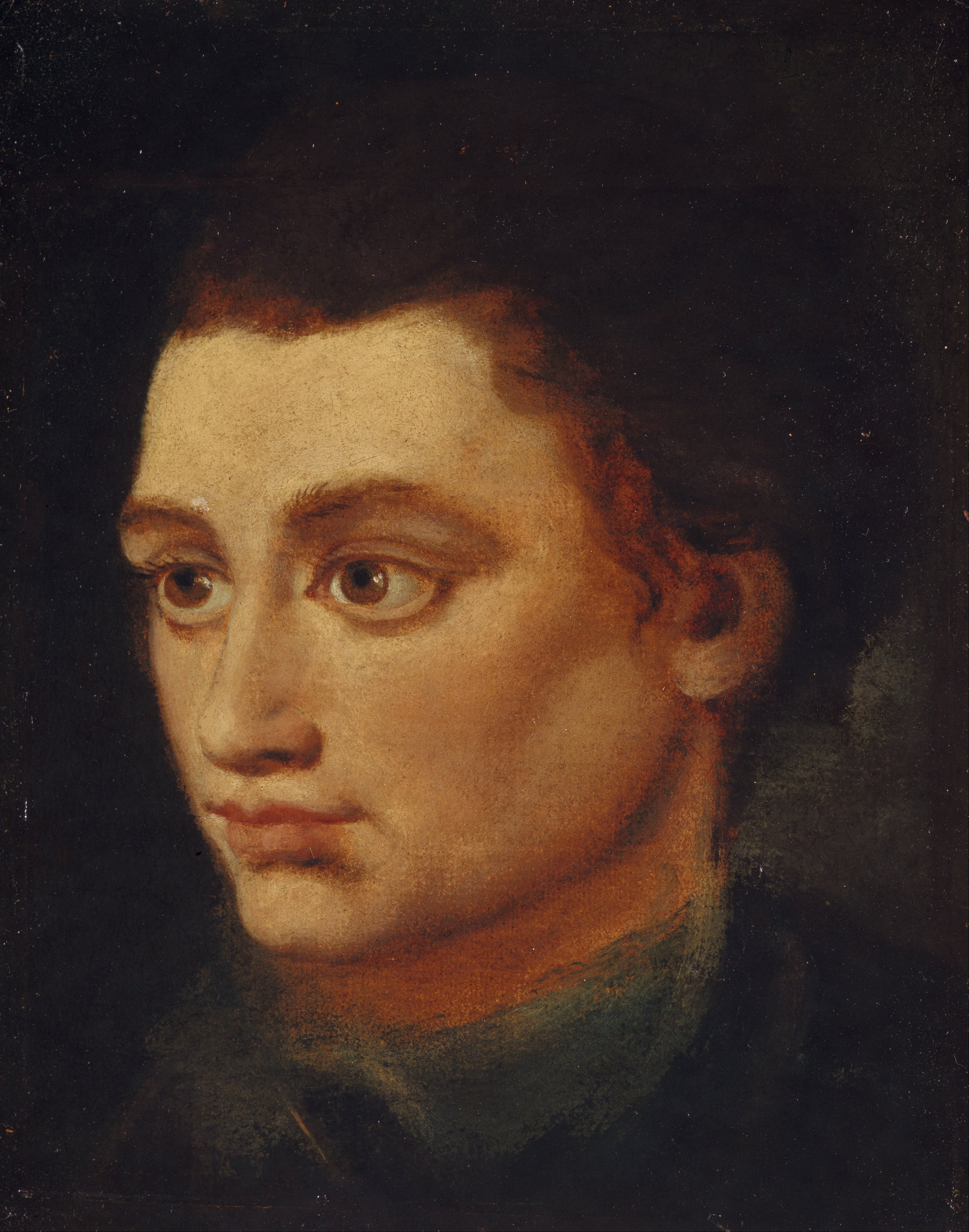
Robert Fergusson died 16 October

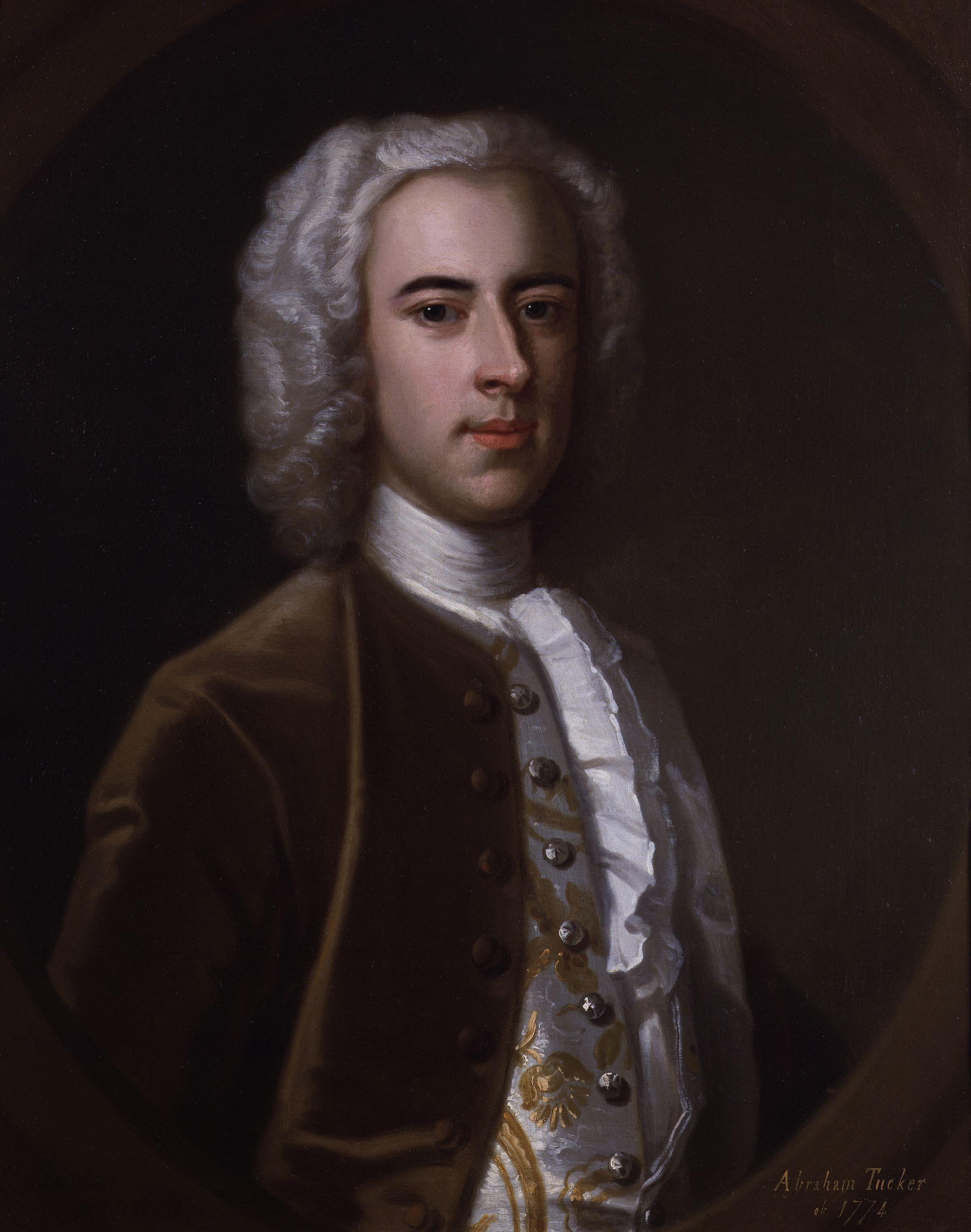
Abraham Tucker died 20 November

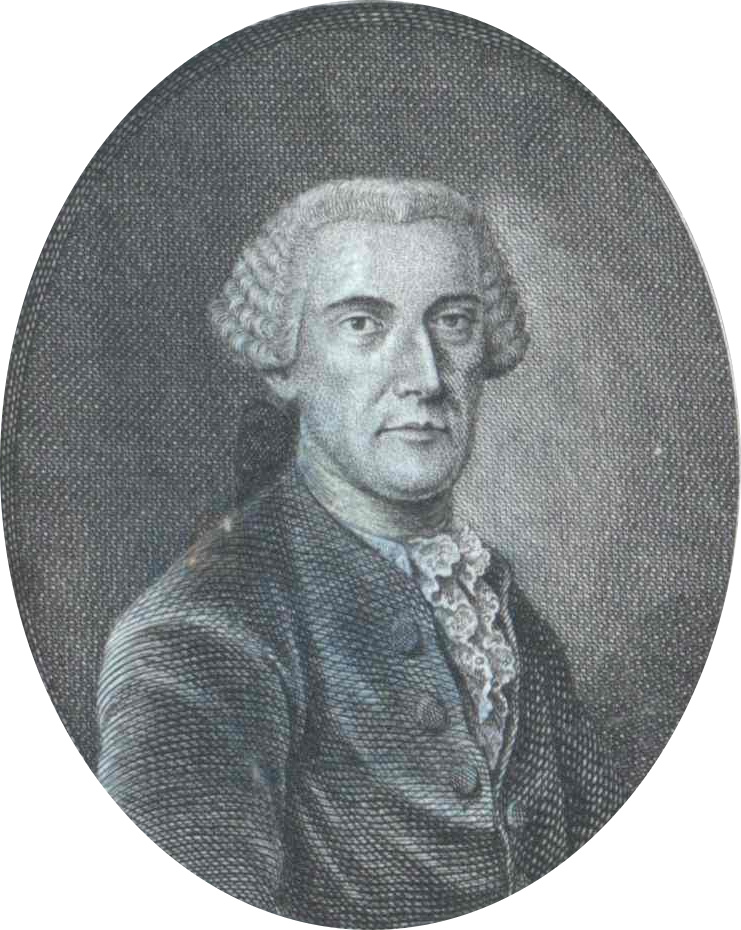
Johann Siegmund Popowitsch died 21 November

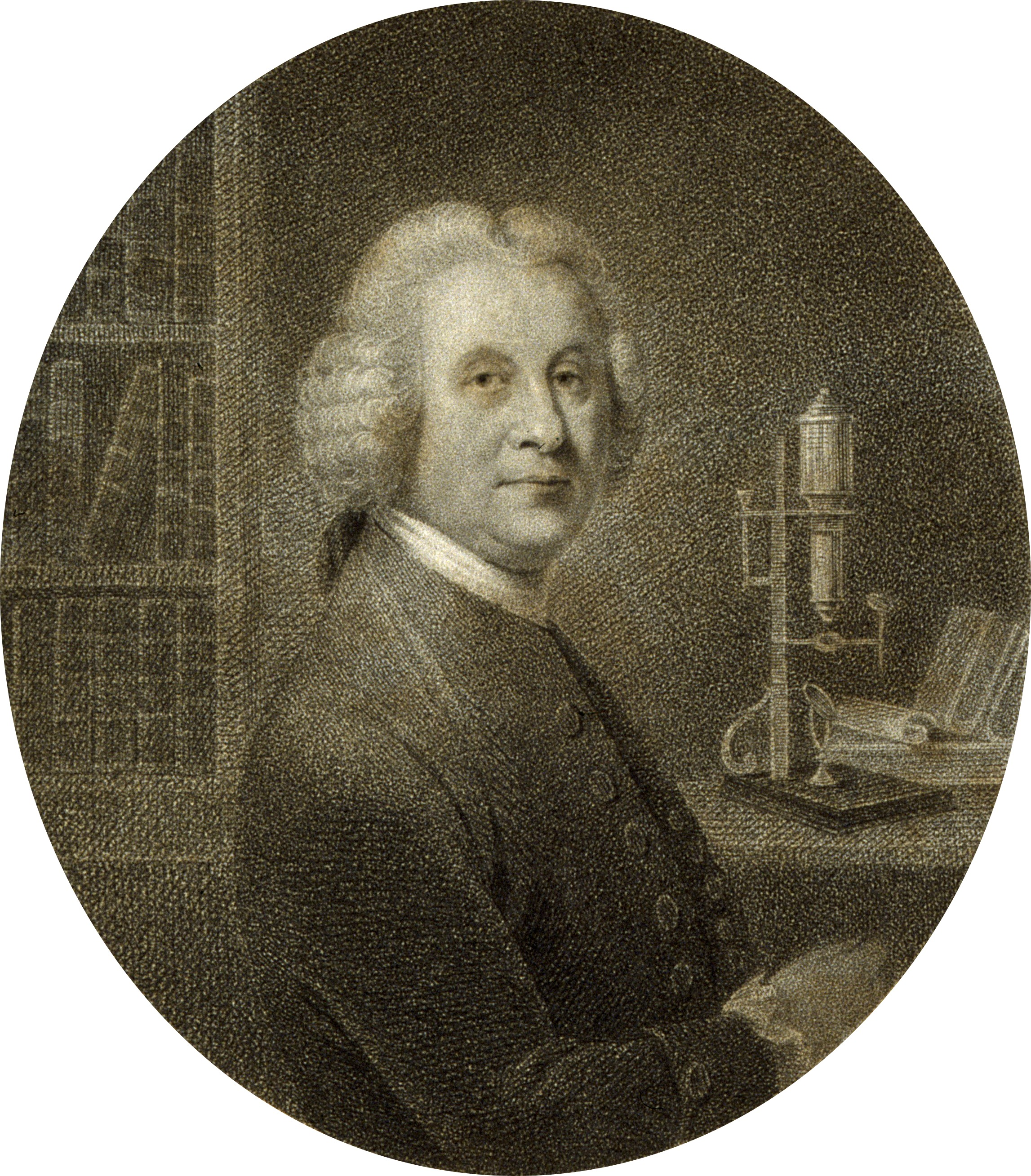
Henry Baker died 25 November

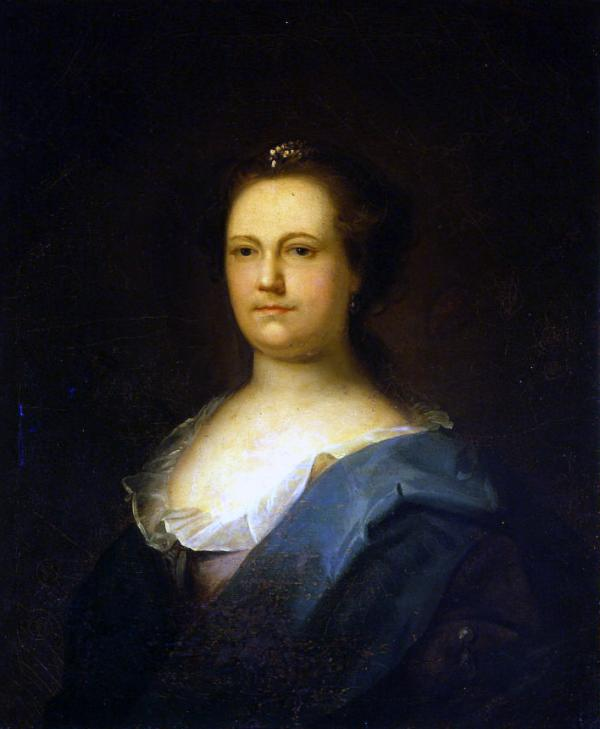
Deborah Read died 19 December

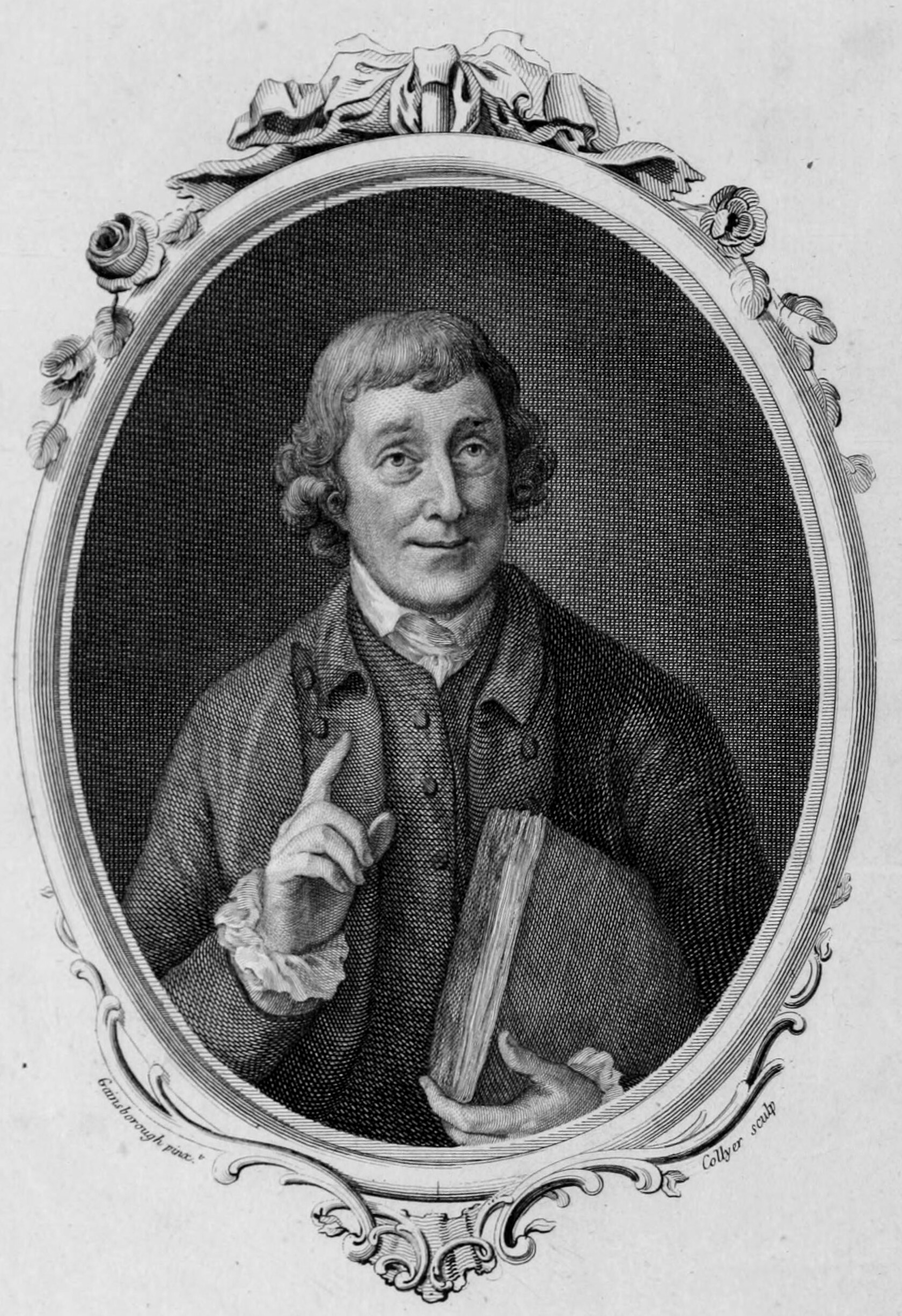
Paul Whitehead (satirist) died 20 December

=== January ===
- January 1
  - Thomas Hollis, English political philosopher and author (b. 1720)
  - Jan Jerzy Plersch, Polish sculptor (b. 1704)
- January 7
  - Antoine Clériadus de Choiseul-Beaupré, French archbishop (b. 1707)
  - Józef Andrzej Załuski, Polish bishop (b. 1702)
- January 9 – Jacques-François Blondel, French architect (b. 1705)
- January 13
  - Shem Drowne, American coppersmith (b. 1683)
  - John Pugh Pryse, British Member of Parliament (b. 1739)
- January 18 – Louis de Brienne de Conflans d'Armentières, French general (b. 1711)
- January 19 – Thomas Gillespie, Scottish church leader (b. 1708)
- January 21
  - Florian Leopold Gassmann, Austrian composer (b. 1729)
  - Mustafa III, Sultan of the Ottoman Empire from 1757 to 1774 (b. 1717)
  - James Lacy, actor and theatre manager (b. 1696)
  - Hans Jacob Scheel, Norwegian general (b. 1714)
- January 22 – Dudley Cosby, 1st Baron Sydney, Irish politician (b. 1730)
- January 29 – Franciszek Ferdynant Lubomirski, Franciszek Ferdynand Lubomirski was a Polish nobleman (b. 1710)
- January 30
  - Jean-Pierre Guignon, French composer (b. 1702)
  - František Tůma, Czech composer (b. 1704)
- January 31 – Consort Yu, Concubine of Chinese Emperor Qianlong (b. 1730)

=== February ===
- February 1 – Johann Heinrich Zopf, German historian (b. 1691)
- February 4 – Charles Marie de La Condamine, French explorer, geographer, and mathematician (b. 1701)
- February 8 – Thomas Belasyse, 1st Earl Fauconberg, British peer (b. 1699)
- February 17 – Robert Jones, English politician (b. 1704)
- February 18 – Karl Michael von Attems, Austrian Catholic archbishop and prince of the Holy Roman Empire (b. 1711)
- February 25 – Johann Georg, Chevalier de Saxe, German general (b. 1704)
- February 27 – Knud Leem, Norwegian priest and linguist (b. 1697)
- February 28 – Anthony Askew, English physician and book collector (b. 1722)

=== March ===
- March 1 – Pierre-Antoine Gourgaud, French actor (b. 1706)
- March 2 – William Talbot, English evangelical clergyman (b. 1717)
- March 3 – Andrew Oliver, American merchant and public official (b. 1706)
- March 4 – William Boys, Royal Navy officer (b. 1700)
- March 5 – Georg Joachim Mark, German theologian (b. 1726)
- March 7 – Carlo Alberto Guidoboni Cavalchini, Catholic cardinal (b. 1683)
- March 10 – William Browne, English physician (b. 1692)
- March 18 – Matthew Fetherstonhaugh, British politician (b. 1714)
- March 19 – Lucas Ramírez Galán, Roman Catholic archbishop (b. 1715)
- March 21 – Diego Bernardo de Peredo y Navarrete, Mexican Roman Catholic clergyman, bishop of Yucatán (b. 1696)
- March 25
  - Spencer Cowper, Dean of Durham Cathedral (b. 1713)
  - Countess Caroline of Nassau-Saarbrücken, German noble (b. 1704)
  - Zeynep Sultan, Ottoman princess, Daughter of Ottoman Sultan Ahmed III (b. 1720)
- March 30 – Countess Palatine Caroline of Zweibrücken, German noble (b. 1721)

=== April ===
- April 1 – Claudius Amyand, English politician (b. 1718)
- April 4 – Oliver Goldsmith, Anglo-Irish writer, poet, and physician (b. 1728)
- April 5 – Situ Panchen, Tibetan lama and painter (b. 1700)
- April 11 – Elias Gottlob Haussmann, German artist (b. 1695)
- April 15
  - Somerset Butler, 1st Earl of Carrick, Irish peer (b. 1718)
  - Jean Ignace de La Ville, French diplomat (b. 1690)
- April 17 – John Winslow, British Army general (b. 1703)
- April 18
  - Michael Ranft, German historian, writer and hofmeister (b. 1700)
  - Rodolfo Emilio Brignole Sale, politician (b. 1708)
- April 20
  - Aleksandr Bibikov, Russian statesman and military officer (b. 1729)
  - Jean Saas, French lexicographer (b. 1703)
- April 23
  - Hafiz Rahmat Khan Barech, Afghan highlander (b. 1723)
  - Christian Wilhelm Ernst Dietrich, German artist (b. 1712)
- April 24 – Sara Banzet, French educator, diarist (b. 1745)
- April 25 – John Fane, 9th Earl of Westmorland, English Earl (b. 1728)
- April 26 – Maria Machteld van Sypesteyn, Dutch painter (b. 1724)
- April 28 – Gottfried Lengnich, historian and politician (b. 1689)
- April 29 – Eland Mossom, lawyer, recorder of the City of Kilkenny and representative in the Parliament of Ireland (b. 1709)

=== May ===
- May 1 – William Hewson, British physiologist (b. 1739)
- May 3 – Heinrich August de la Motte Fouqué, German general (b. 1698)
- May 4
  - Duke Anthony Ulrich of Brunswick, Russian general (b. 1714)
  - Adam Sherrill, First European to cross the Catawba River (b. 1697)
  - Richard Alchorne Worge, British Member of Parliament (b. 1707)
- May 6 – John Ward, 1st Viscount Dudley and Ward, British politician (b. 1704)
- May 8 – Réginald Outhier, French astronomer and priest (b. 1694)
- May 10
  - King Louis XV of France (b. 1710)
  - Timothy Woodbridge, Superintendent of Indian Affairs (b. 1709)
- May 12 – Giuseppe Antonio Luchi, Italian painter (b. 1709)
- May 17 – Jeremiah Theus, American artist (b. 1716)
- May 18 – William FitzRoy, 3rd Duke of Cleveland, English noble (b. 1698)
- May 23 – Tatiana Mikhailovna Troepolskaya, actor (b. 1744)
- May 26 – Wilhelm Reinhard von Neipperg, Austrian field marshal (b. 1684)

=== June ===
- June 3 – Joseph Gerrish, Canadian politician (b. 1709)
- June 7
  - Ignatius van der Beken, Flemish painter (b. 1689)
  - Charles Townley, Officer of Arms (b. 1713)
- June 11 – Emmerich Joseph von Breidbach zu Bürresheim, Roman Catholic archbishop (b. 1707)
- June 15 – Karl Heinrich von Bogatzky, German hymnwriter (b. 1690)
- June 18 – Francis Andrews, Irish politician (b. 1718)
- June 20 – Joshua Kirby, British artist (b. 1716)
- June 24 – Thomas Amory, English tutor/minister/poet (b. 1701)
- June 27 – Nicolas Tindal, British historian (b. 1688)
- June 29 – Zachary Pearce, English bishop (b. 1690)

=== July ===
- July 1 – Henry Fox, 1st Baron Holland, British politician (b. 1705)
- July 4 – William Price, Welsh High Sheriff and antiquarian (b. 1690)
- July 8 – Brooke Forester, British politician (b. 1717)
- July 9 – Anna Morandi Manzolini, internationally known Italian anatomist and anatomical wax modeller (b. 1714)
- July 11 – Sir William Johnson, 1st Baronet, Anglo-Irish official of the British Empire (b. 1715)
- July 13 – Otto von Münchhausen, German botanist (b. 1716)
- July 14
  - Matthew Blakiston, British politician (b. 1702)
  - James O'Hara, 2nd Baron Tyrawley, Irish officer in the British Army (b. 1682)
- July 17 – Miguel Anselmo Álvarez de Abreu y Valdéz, Bishop of Antequera, Oaxaca, México; Bishop (b. 1711)
- July 18
  - Sir Thomas Alston, 5th Baronet, English Baronet and MP (b. 1724)
  - Thomas Fitch, Governor of the Connecticut Colony (b. 1700)
- July 21 – Percy Wyndham-O'Brien, 1st Earl of Thomond, Irish earl (b. 1723)
- July 24
  - Caroline Fox, 1st Baroness Holland, British baroness; eldest of the Lennox sisters (b. 1723)
  - Johann George Schmidt, architect from Germany (b. 1707)
- July 25 – John Drummond, British private banker and politician (b. 1723)
- July 27 – Samuel Gottlieb Gmelin, German physician, botanist, and explorer (b. 1744)

=== August ===
- August 10
  - William Rawlinson Earle, British Member of Parliament (b. 1702)
  - Jean Charles Joseph, Count of Merode, Marquis of Deynze, noble of the Austrian Netherlands (b. 1719)
- August 11
  - Frederik Nannestad, Norwegian bishop (b. 1693)
  - Charles-François Tiphaigne de la Roche, French writer (b. 1722)
- August 13 – Peter Applebye, British-Danish industrialist (b. 1709)
- August 14 – Johann Jakob Reiske, German scholar, physician (b. 1716)
- August 20 – Ann Wager, American educator (b. 1716)
- August 21 – Imperial Noble Consort Qinggong, Qing Dynasty imperial noble consort (b. 1724)
- August 25 – Niccolò Jommelli, Italian composer (b. 1714)
- August 26 – Philipp Jakob Straub, Austrian sculptor (b. 1706)

=== September ===
- September 5 – Sir Charles Herbert Sheffield, 1st Baronet, British estate owner and baronet (b. 1706)
- September 10 – Pierre-Jean Mariette, French art historian (b. 1694)
- September 16 – Christophe Le Menu de Saint-Philbert, composer (b. 1720)
- September 18 – Johann Friedrich Meckel, the Elder, German anatomist (b. 1724)
- September 22
  - Filippo Farsetti, Italian patron (b. 1703)
  - Charles Louis, Duke of Schleswig-Holstein-Sonderburg-Beck (b. 1690)
  - Pope Clement XIV, pope and bishop of Rome from 1769 to 1774 (b. 1705)
- September 24 – Greta Donner, Swedish businesswoman (b. 1726)
- September 25
  - John Bradstreet, Canadian-born soldier (b. 1714)
  - Sir Richard Corbet, 4th Baronet, British Member of Parliament (b. 1696)
  - Sholto Douglas, 15th Earl of Morton, British earl (b. 1732)

=== October ===
- October 2 – Alfonso Clemente de Aróstegui, Scholar and Roman Catholic bishop (b. 1698)
- October 8 – Philippe Caffieri, French sculptor (b. 1714)
- October 11 – Jean-Claude Chambellan Duplessis, French designer (b. 1699)
- October 12 – Tokugawa Haruaki, Japanese samurai (b. 1753)
- October 13 – Willem Bentinck van Rhoon, Dutch politician (b. 1704)
- October 15 – Dmitry Ukhtomsky, Russian architect (b. 1719)
- October 16 – Robert Fergusson, Scottish poet and writer (b. 1750)
- October 22 – William Molineux, Colonial American merchant (b. 1718)
- October 23 – Michel Benoist, French Jesuit missionary, scientist (b. 1715)
- October 27 – Gerolamo Mengozzi Colonna, Italian painter (b. 1686)
- October 28 – Jean Löfblad, Swedish actor (b. 1728)
- October 29 – Ferdinand Augustin Hallerstein, Jesuit missionary (b. 1703)
- October 31
  - Thomas Hunt, English academic, Oxford Laudian Professor of Arabic (b. 1696)
  - Edward Noel, 1st Viscount Wentworth, British peer (b. 1715)

=== November ===
- November 1 – Johan Peter Falk, Swedish botanist (b. 1732)
- November 3 – Glocester Ridley, English writer (b. 1702)
- November 5
  - Urbain Boiret, Canadian priest (b. 1731)
  - Peter Spendelowe Lamborn, English engraver and miniature painter (b. 1722)
  - John Murray, 3rd Duke of Atholl, British peer (b. 1729)
- November 6 – Thomas Bradshaw, British Member of Parliament (b. 1733)
- November 13 – Robert Rochfort, 1st Earl of Belvedere, Anglo-Irish politician and peer (b. 1708)
- November 15 – Anne Howard, Countess of Effingham, British countess (b. 1695)
- November 16 – Francis Owen, British Member of Parliament (b. 1745)
- November 17 – Jean Althen, Armenian agronomist (b. 1709)
- November 20 – Abraham Tucker, English philosopher (b. 1705)
- November 21 – Johann Siegmund Popowitsch, Austrian botanist (b. 1705)
- November 22
  - Robert Clive, British military officer and East India Company official (b. 1725)
  - Edward Rooker, English engraver, draughtsman and actor (b. 1712)
- November 23 – Gottfried Bernhard Göz, German artist (b. 1708)
- November 25 – Henry Baker, English naturalist (b. 1698)
- November 28 – Pierre de l'Estache, French sculptor (b. 1688)
- November 29 – Gabriel de Clieu, Guadeloupean politician (b. 1687)
- November 30
  - John Rann, English criminal and highwayman (b. 1750)
  - Nicolas-François Dupré de Saint-Maur, French academic (b. 1695)

=== December ===
- December 2 – Johann Friedrich Agricola, German composer (b. 1720)
- December 5 – Karunai Prakasar, Spiritual writer and philosopher (b. 1756)
- December 13 – Guillaume du Tillot, French politician (b. 1711)
- December 16
  - Susanne von Klettenberg, German abbess and writer (b. 1723)
  - François Quesnay, French economist (b. 1694)
  - Francis Willoughby, 3rd Baron Middleton, British baron (b. 1726)
- December 17 – Friedrich Wilhelm, Graf von Wylich und Lottum, Prussian army officer (b. 1716)
- December 19 – Deborah Read, spouse of Benjamin Franklin (b. 1708)
- December 20 – Paul Whitehead, British satirist (b. 1710)
- December 21 – Thomas Broughton, English clergyman, biographer and miscellaneous writer (b. 1704)
- December 23 – Francesco Maria Preti, architect (b. 1701)
- December 24 – Peter Fenger, Danish merchant (b. 1719)
- December 26
  - Godfrey Bagnall Clarke, British politician (b. 1742)
  - Stephen Fox, 2nd Baron Holland, British politician and peer (b. 1745)
- December 27
  - Louis Groston de Saint-Ange de Bellerive, Canadian explorer (b. 1700)
  - Francis Wollaston, English scientist (b. 1694)
- December 29
  - Toussaint-Gaspard Taconet, French actor (b. 1730)
  - Maria Weenix, painter from the Northern Netherlands (b. 1697)
- December 30 – Antoniotto Botta Adorno, high officer (b. 1688)
- December 31 – Johann Christoph Handke, Czech painter (b. 1694)
- date unknown
  - Martinez de Pasqually, French freemason
  - Margaret Calderwood, British diarist (b. 1715)
  - Catherine Michelle de Maisonneuve, French writer and publisher

1775

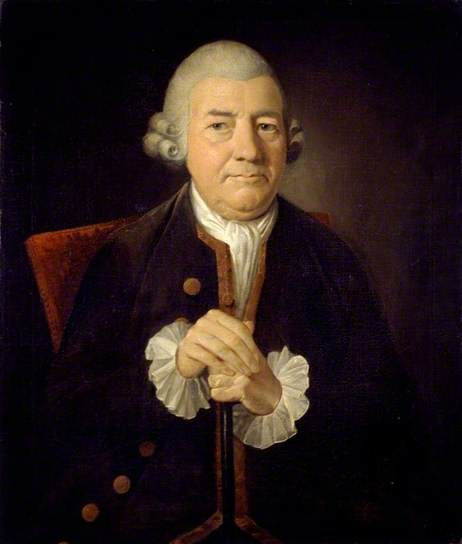
John Baskerville died 8 January

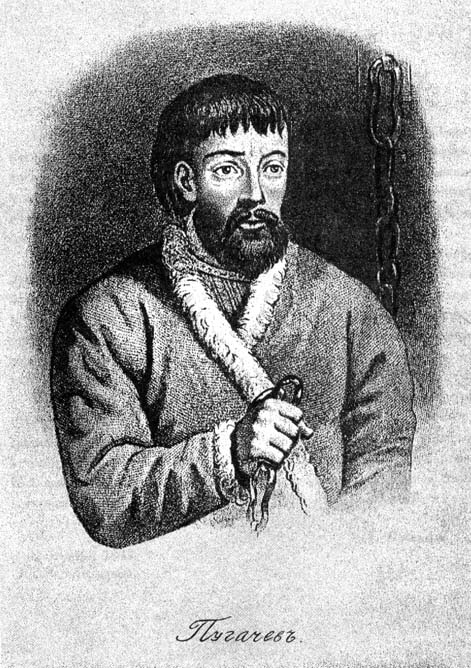
Yemelyan Pugachev died 10 January

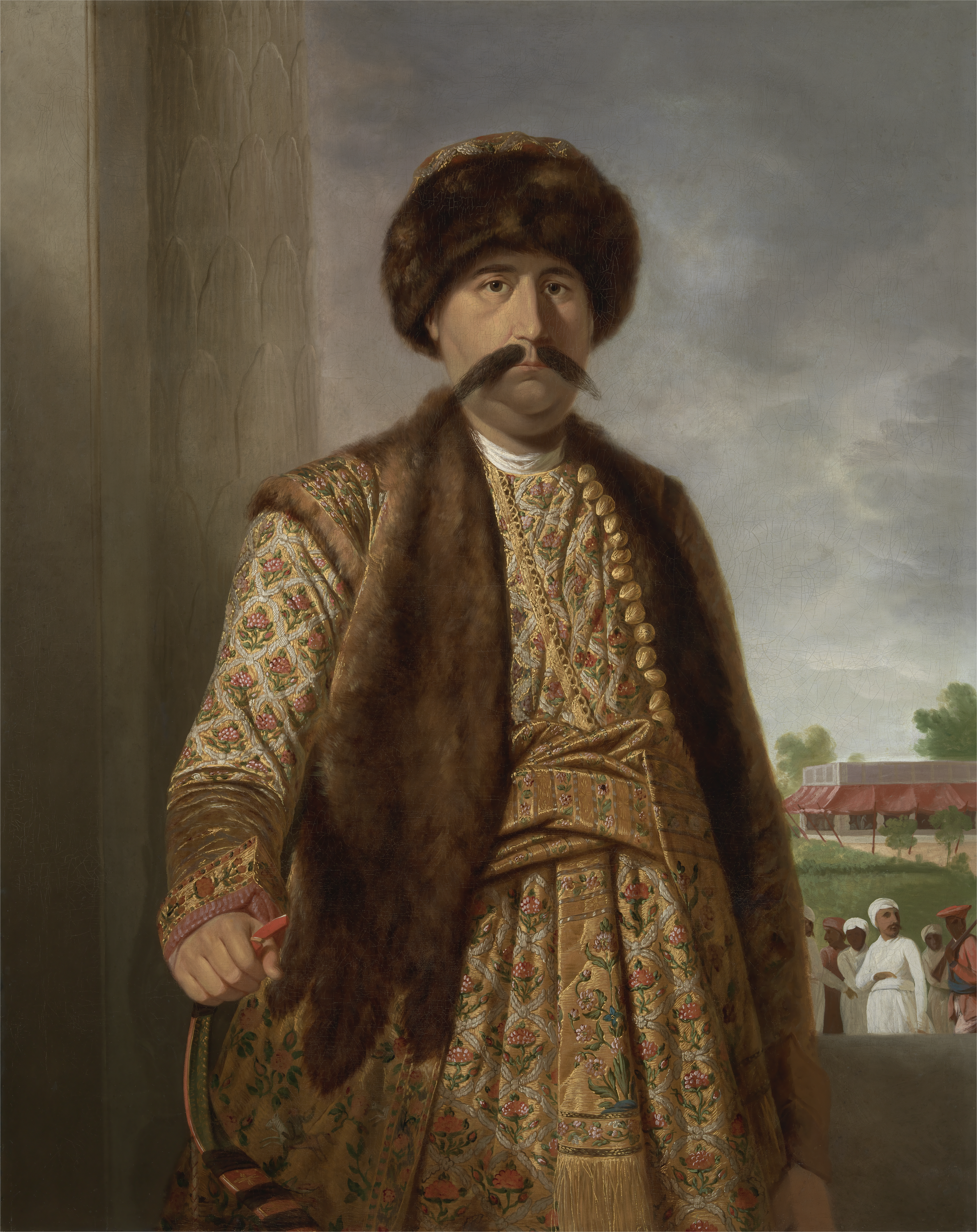
Shuja-ud-Daula died 26 January

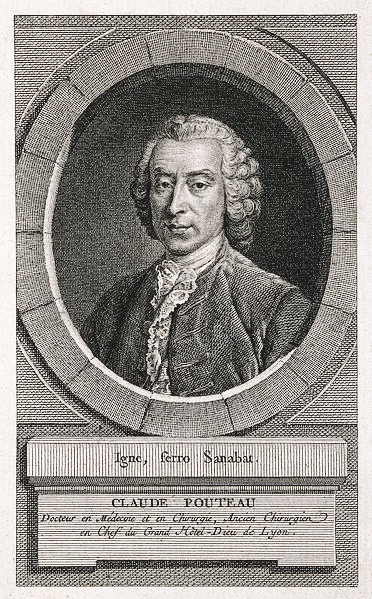
Claude Pouteau died 10 February

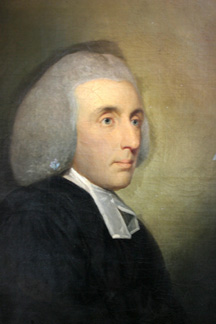
William Small died 25 February

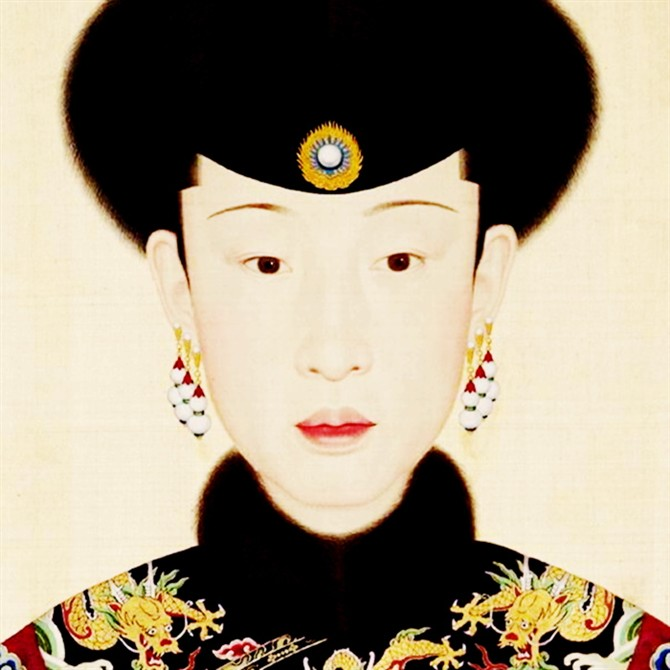
Empress Xiaoyichun died 28 February

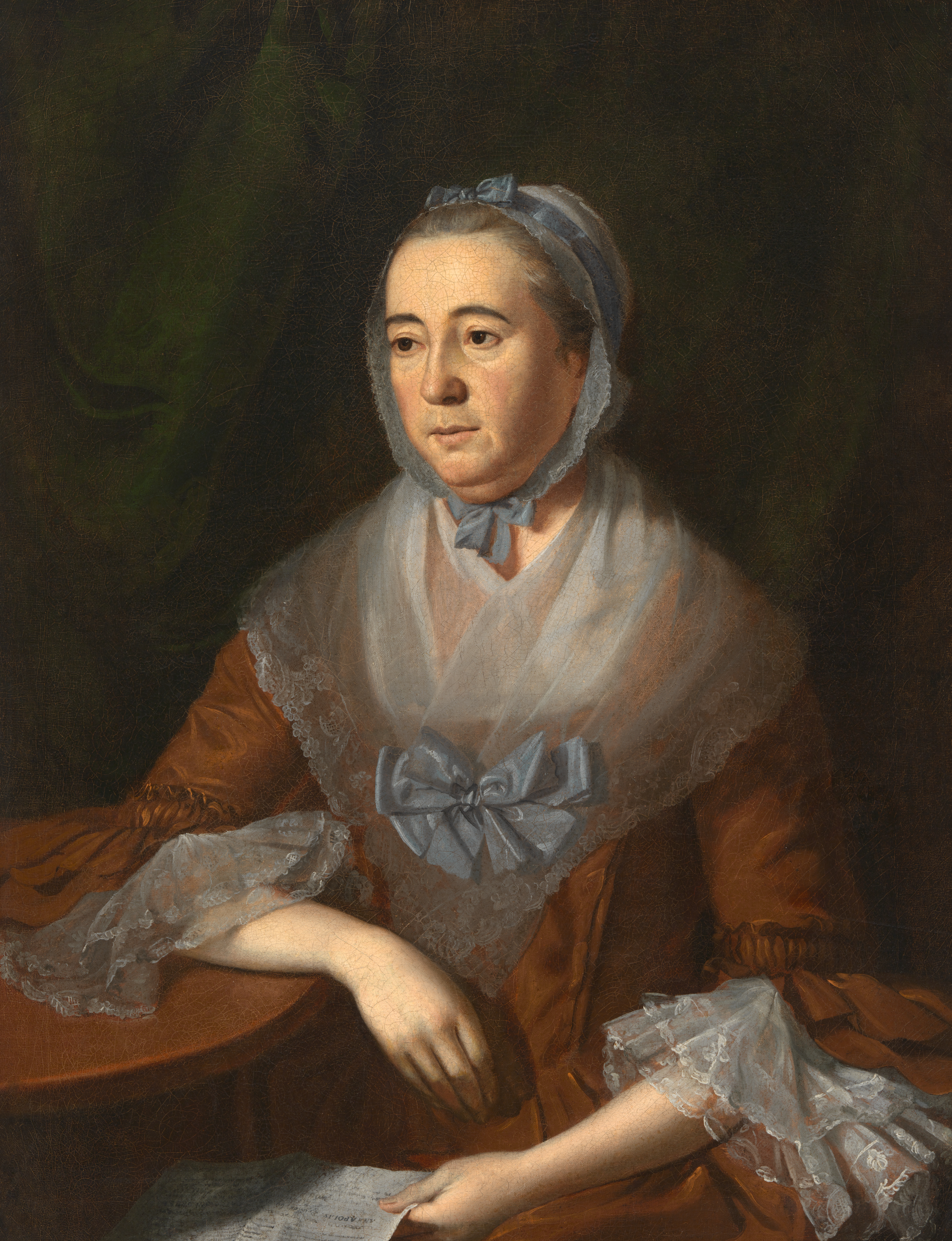
Anne Catherine Hoof Green died 23 March

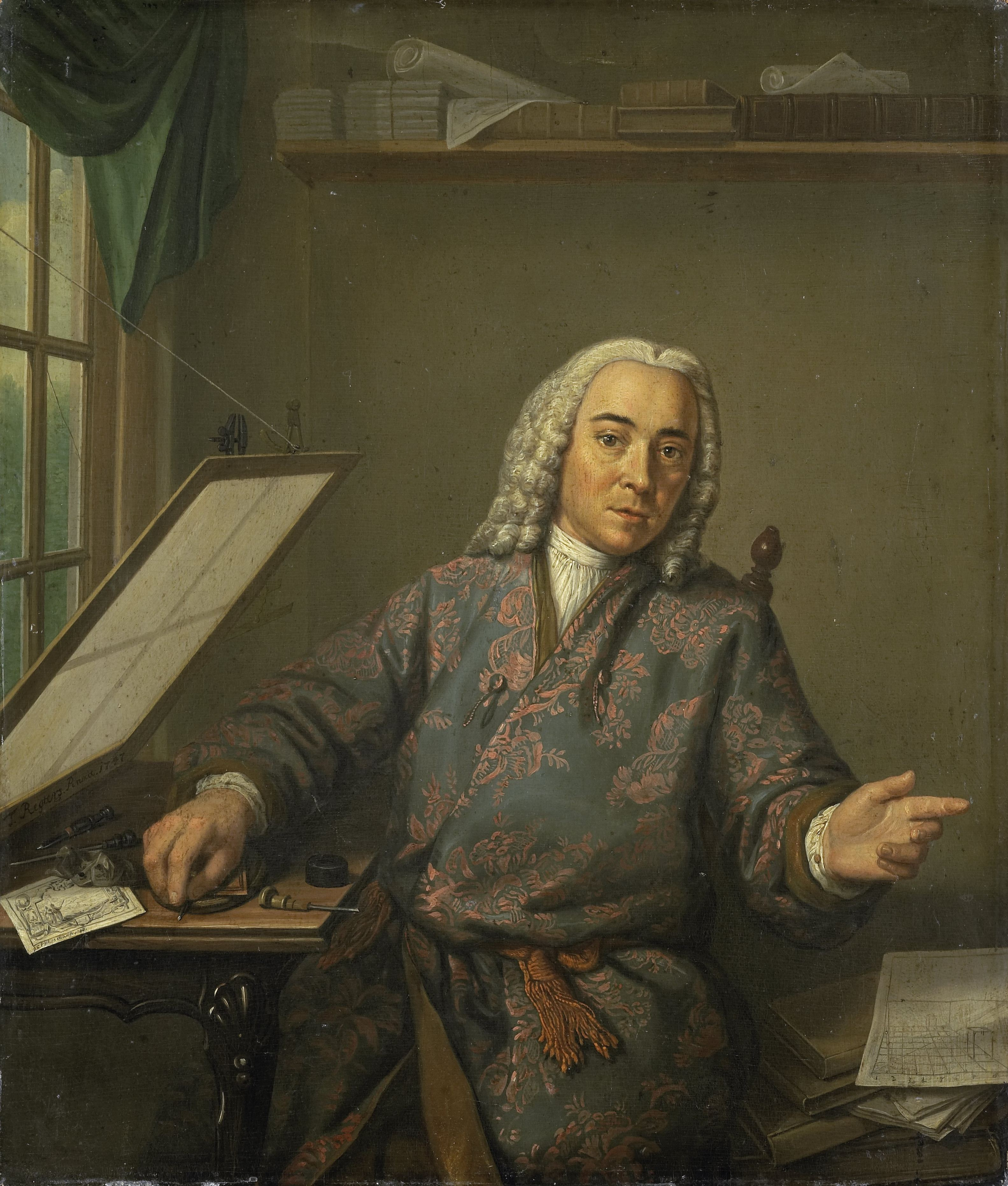
Jan Caspar Philips died 24 April

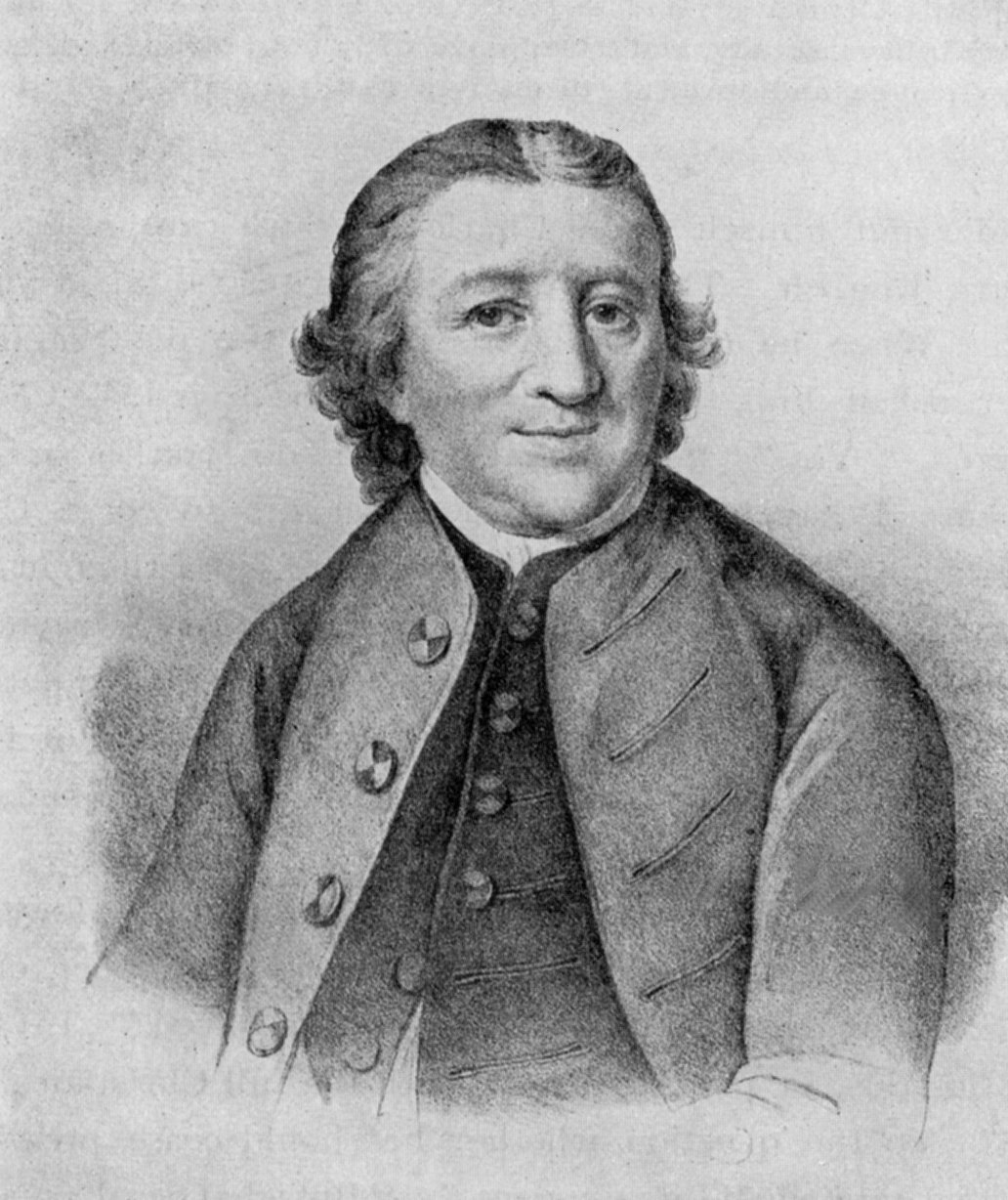
Peter Boehler died 27 April

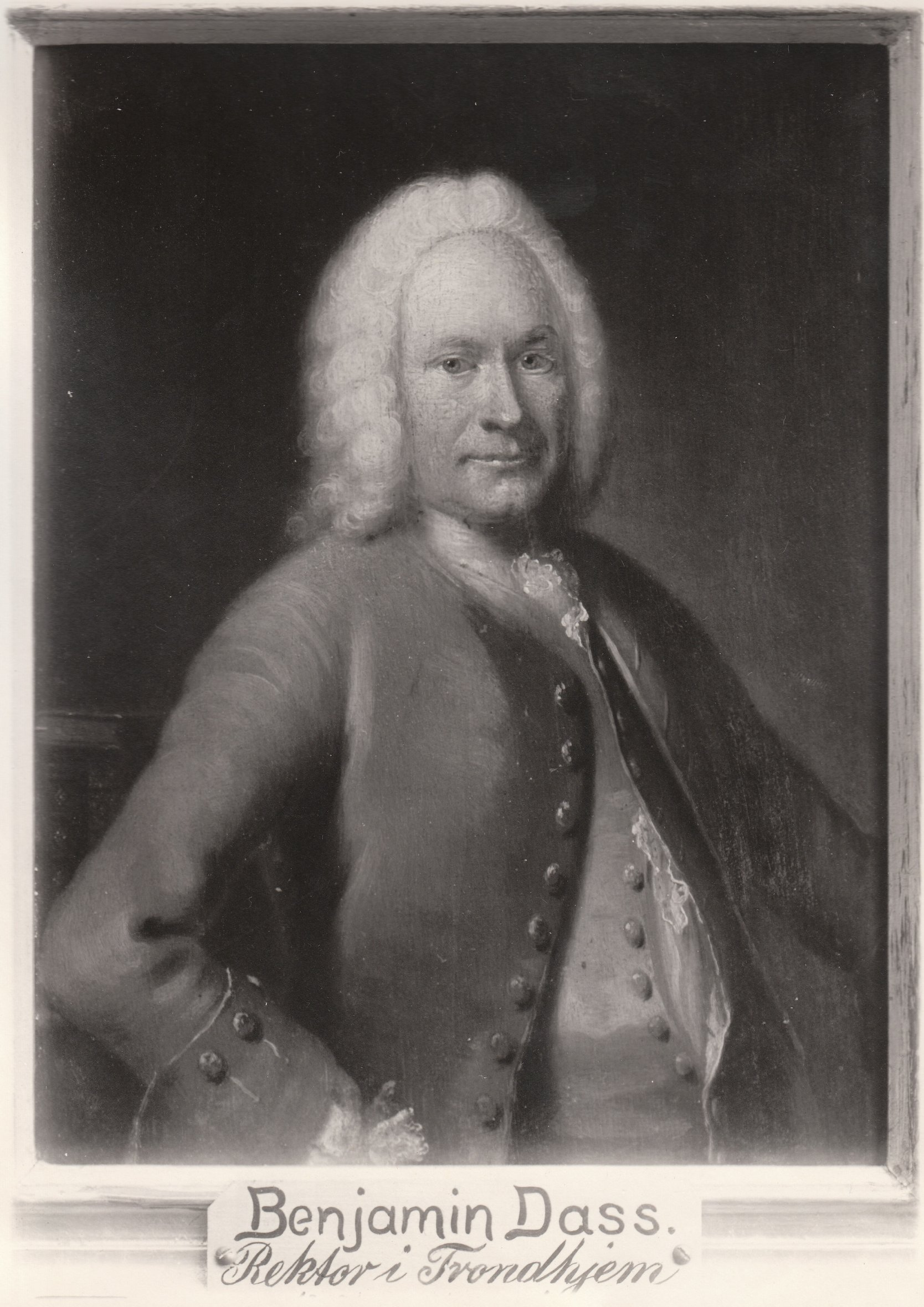
Benjamin Dass died 5 May

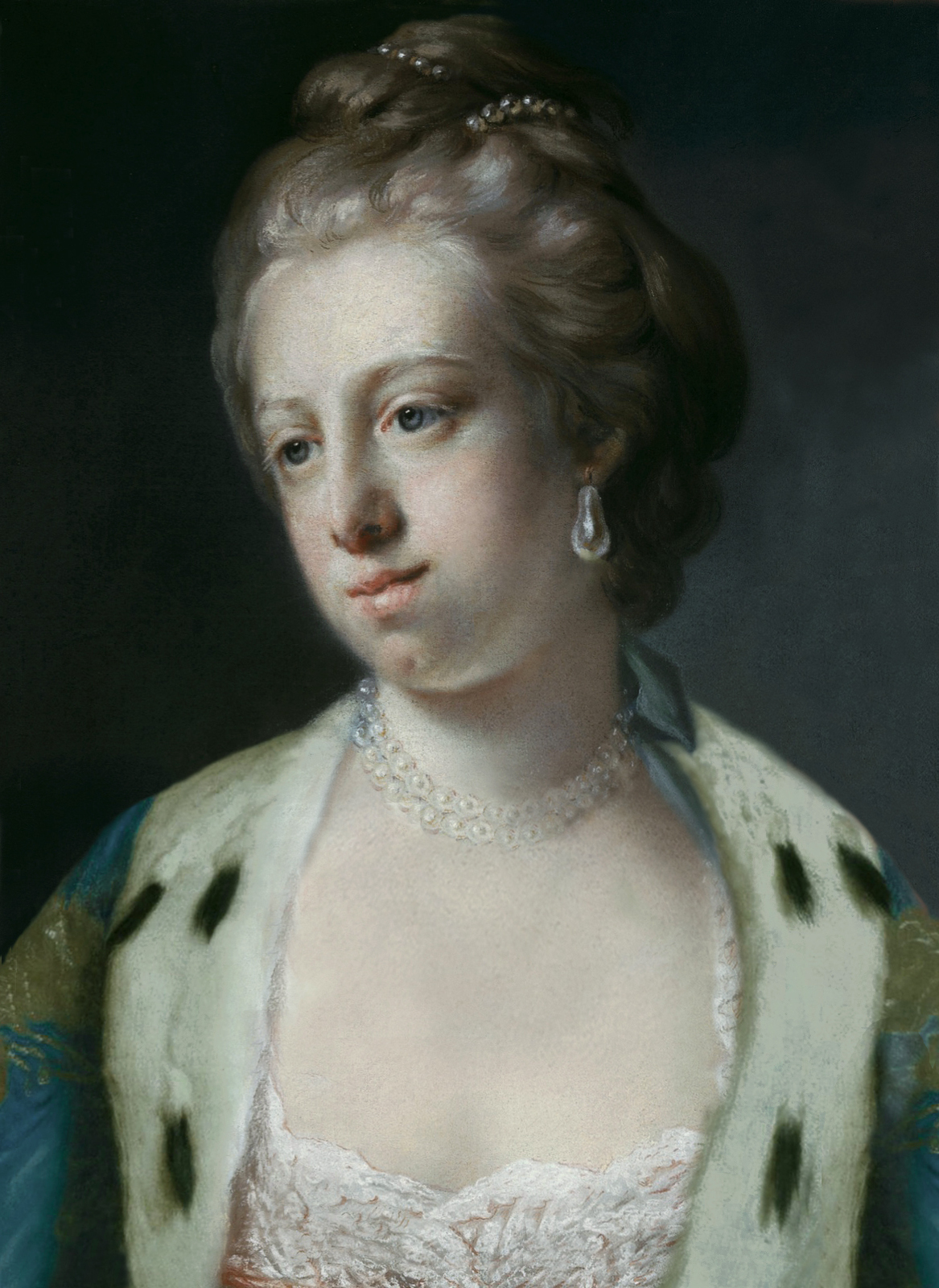
Caroline Matilda of Great Britain died 10 May

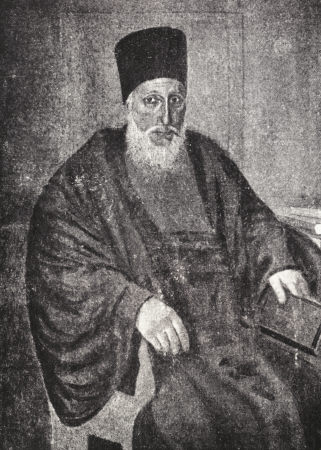
Samuel of Constantinople died 10 May

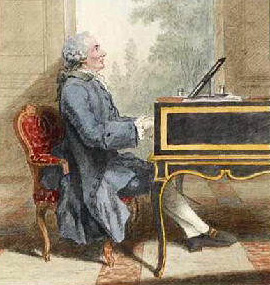
Egidio Duni died 11 June

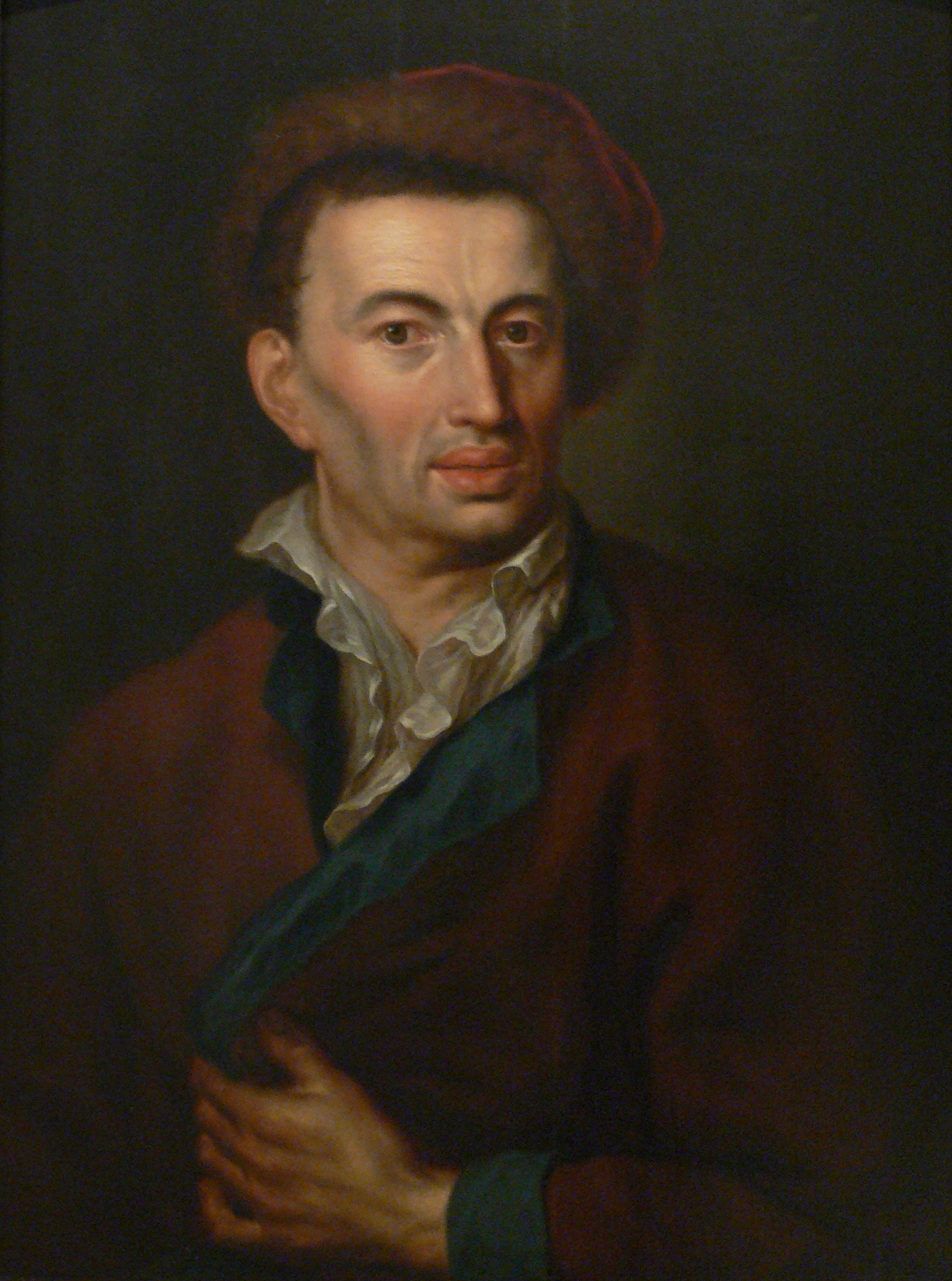
Ignaz Günther died 27 June

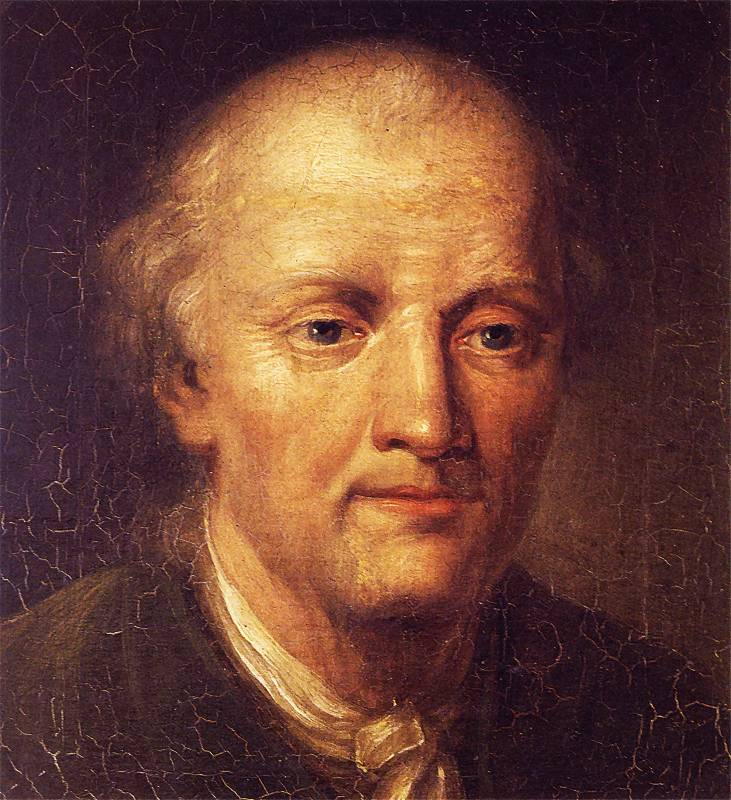
Szymon Czechowicz died 21 July

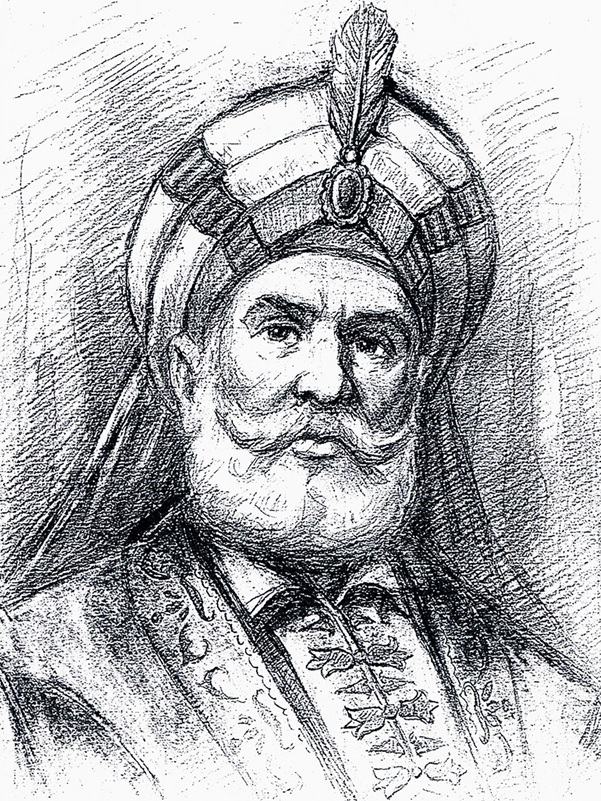
Zahir al-Umar died 21 August

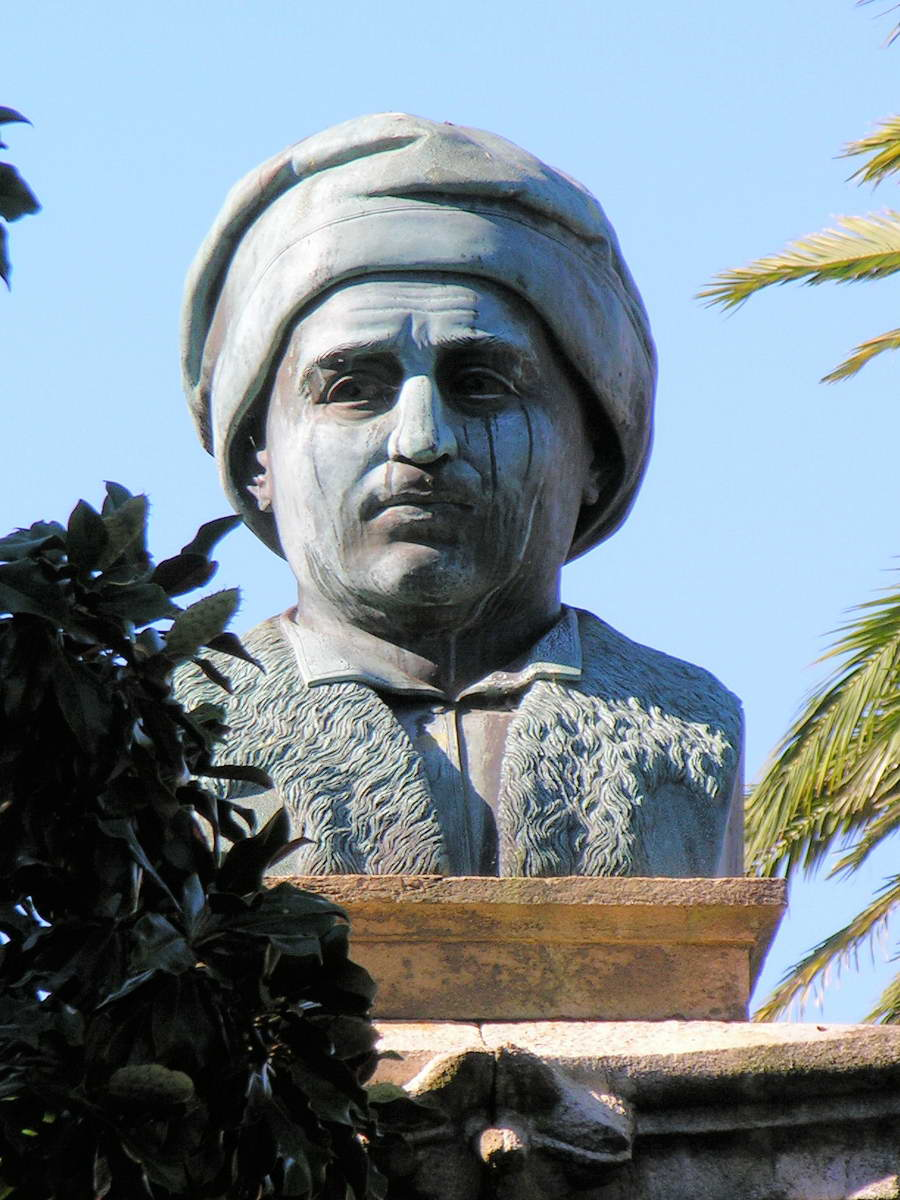
Felipe de Castro died 25 August

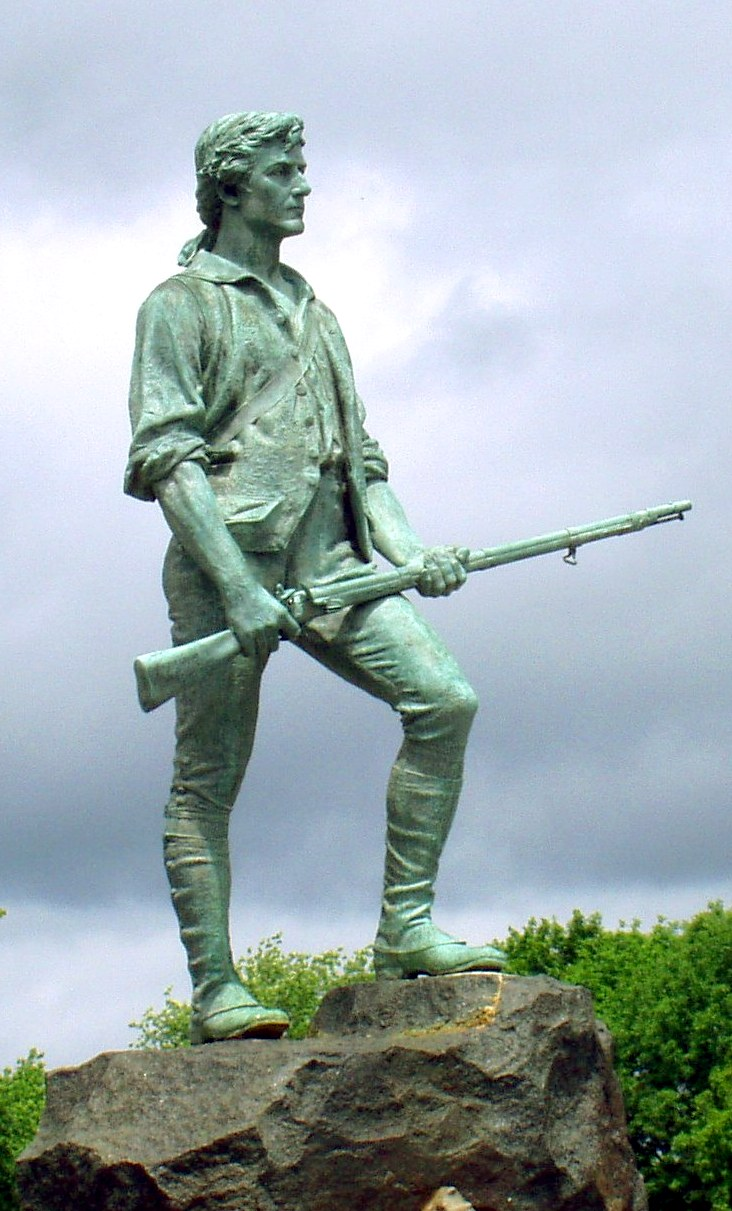
John Parker (captain) died 17 September

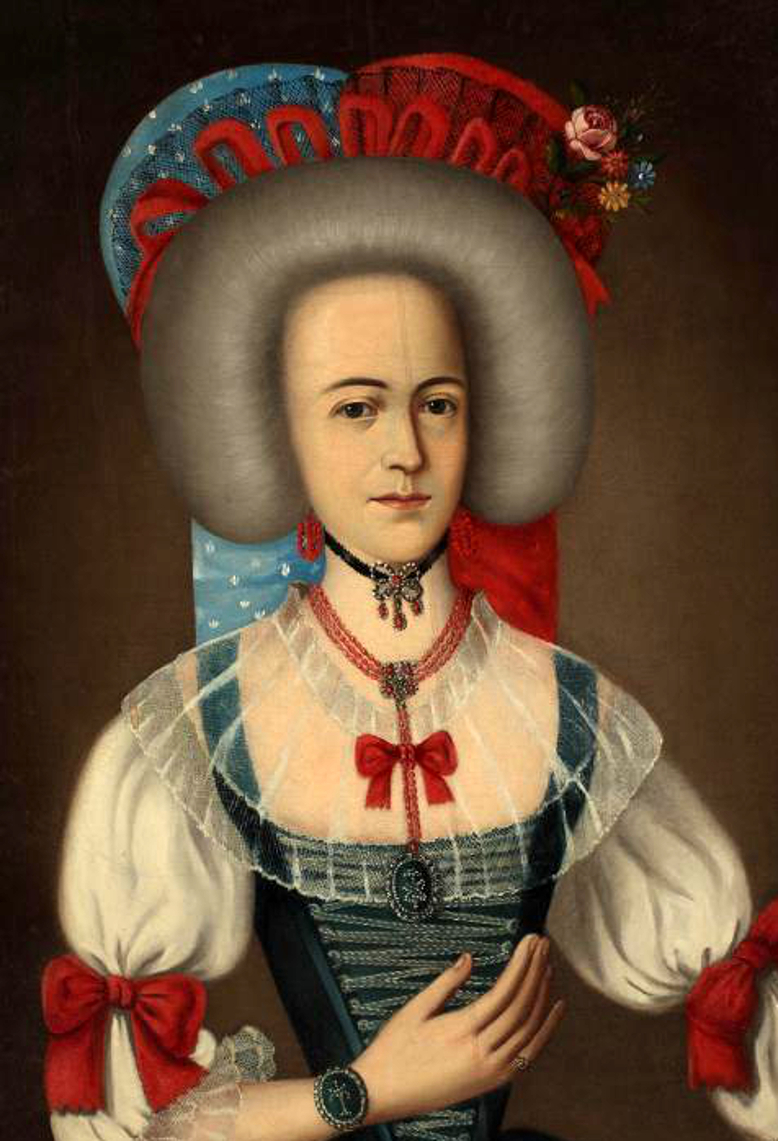
Polixénia Daniel died 24 September

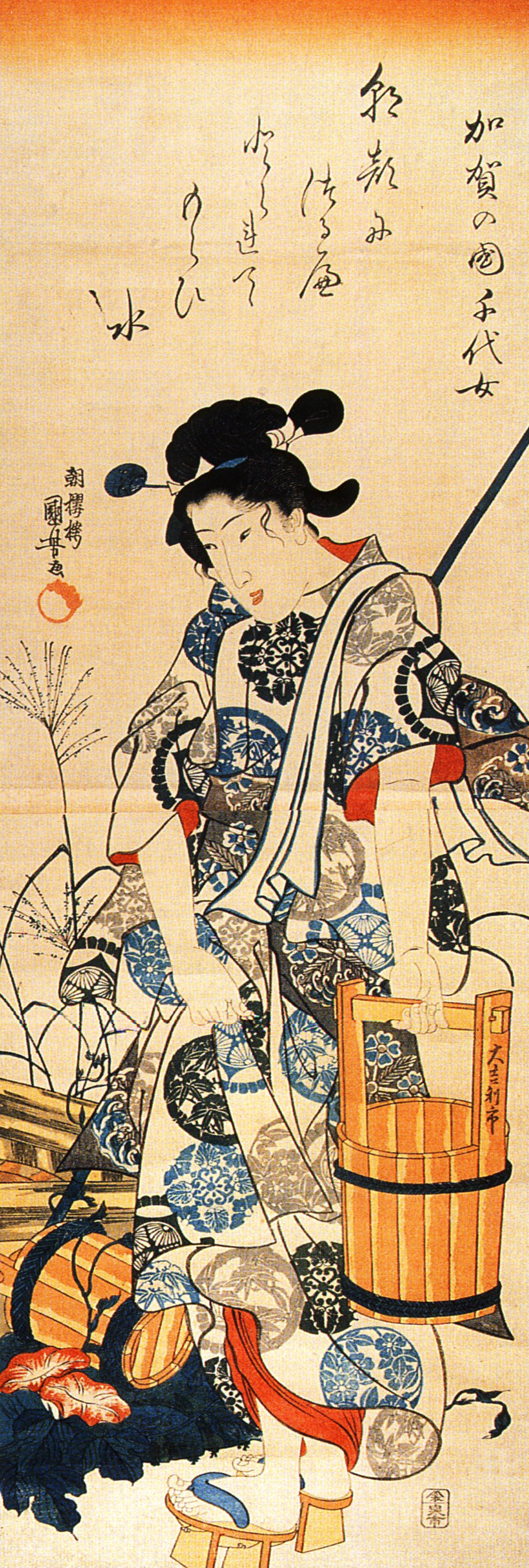
Fukuda Chiyo-ni died 2 October

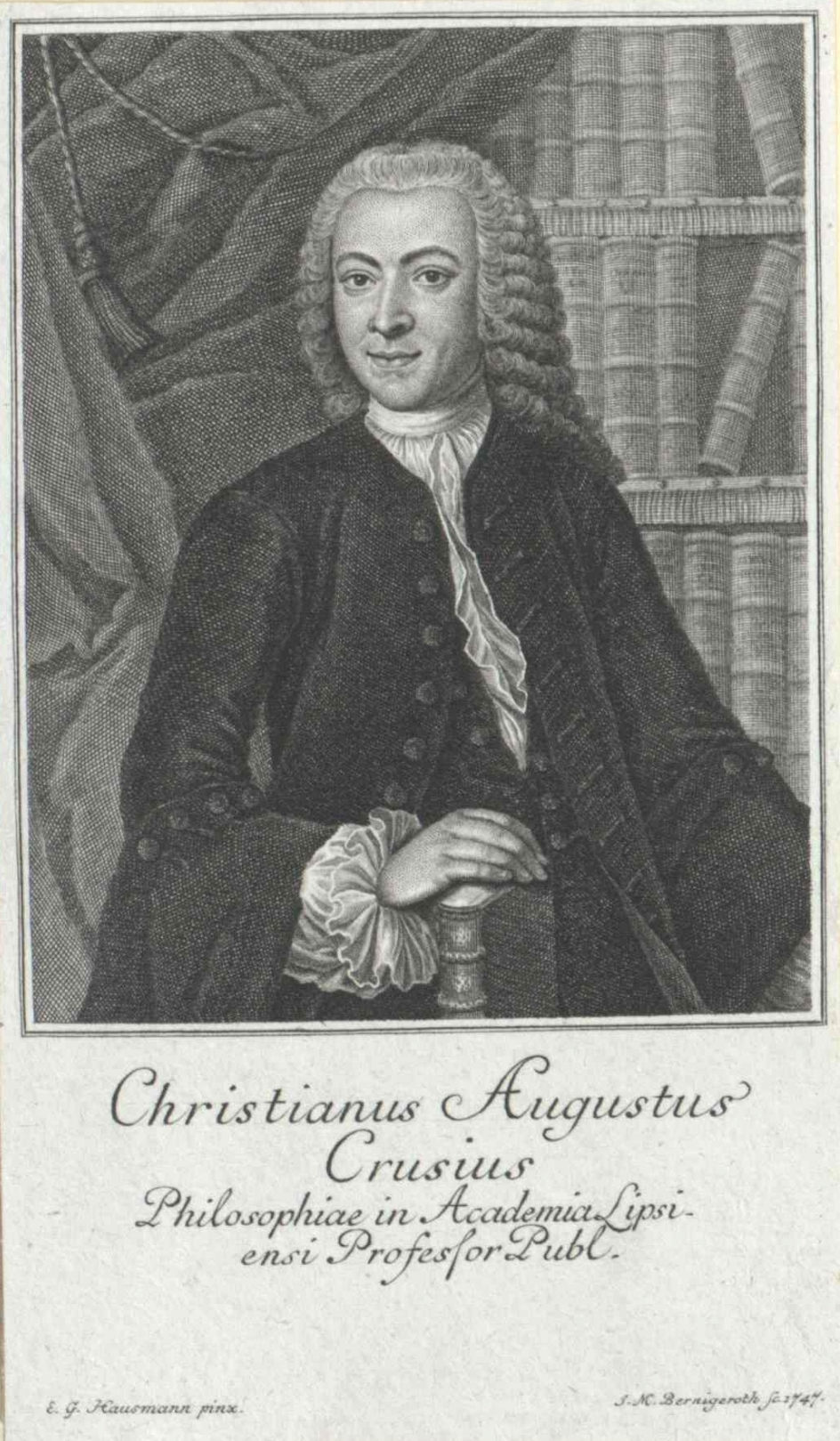
Christian August Crusius died 18 October

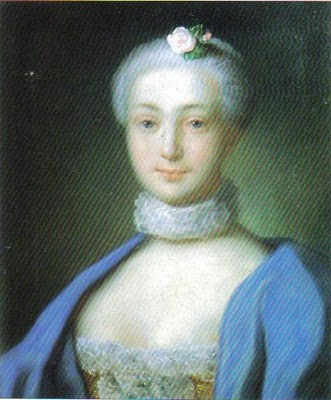
Maria Wilhelmina von Neipperg died 21 October

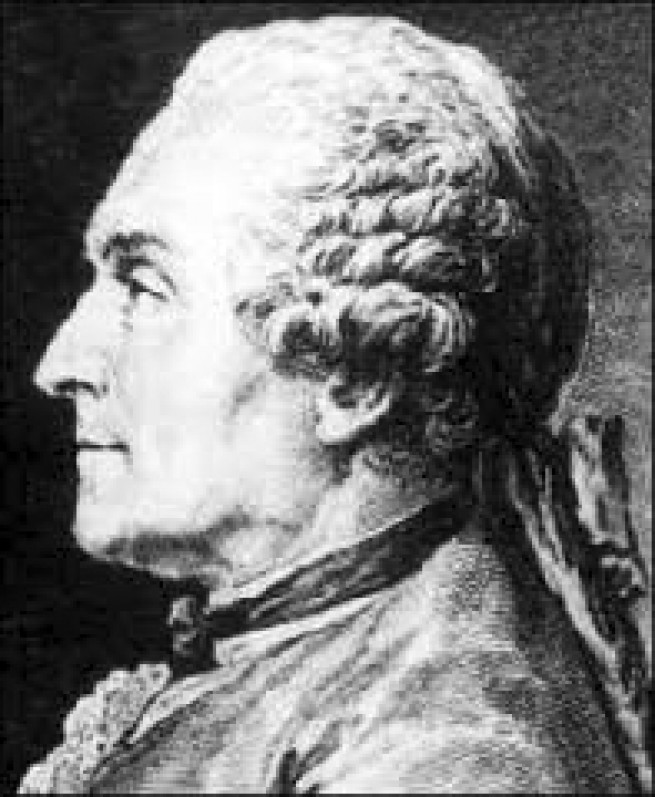
Gabriel François Venel died 29 October

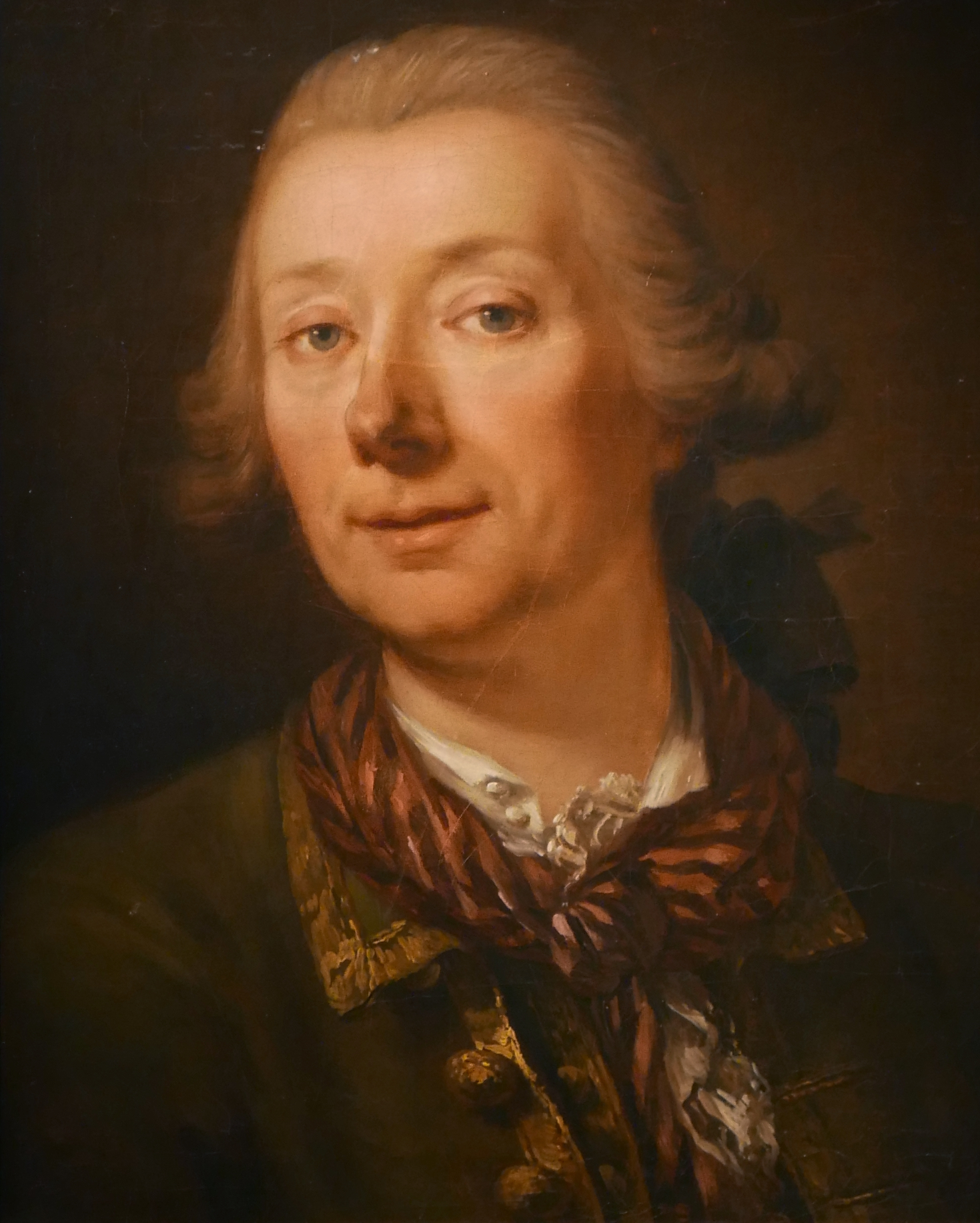
Guillaume de Barrême de Châteaufort died 6 November

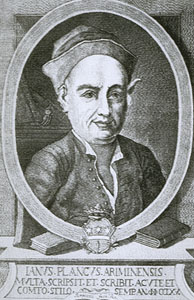
Giovanni Bianchi (physician) died 3 December

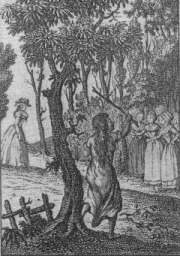
Marie-Angélique Memmie Le Blanc died 15 December

=== January ===
- January 1 – Ahmad Shah Bahadur, 13th Mughal Emperor (b. 1725)
- January 2
  - St George St George, 1st Baron St George, Irish politician (b. 1710)
  - William Napier, 7th Lord Napier, British noble (b. 1730)
- January 3
  - Henry Beekman, New York landowner and provincial assemblyman (b. 1687)
  - Robert Campbell, Nova Scotia politician (b. 1718)
- January 6 – Khawaja Muhammad Zaman of Luari, Sindhi Sufi poet (b. 1713)
- January 8 – John Baskerville, British printer (b. 1706)
- January 10
  - Stringer Lawrence, Early British military leader in India (b. 1697)
  - Yemelyan Pugachev, leader of a Russian peasant uprising (b. 1742)
- January 11
  - Indra Kumari Devi, Queen consort of Nepal (b. 1724)
  - Queen Narendra of Nepal, Queen consort of Gorkha (b. 1723)
  - Prithvi Narayan Shah, last ruler of the Gorkha Kingdom in the Indian subcontinent (b. 1723)
- January 13 – Johann Georg Walch, German theologian (b. 1693)
- January 14 – Peter Schenk the Younger, Dutch engraver and map publisher in Leipzig (b. 1693)
- January 15 – Giovanni Battista Sammartini, Italian composer (b. 1700)
- January 17 – Vincenzo Riccati, Venetian mathematician and physicist (b. 1707)
- January 20
  - Sebastian Klotz, German violin maker (b. 1696)
  - Sir George Oxenden, 5th Baronet, English politician (b. 1694)
- January 21 – Isaac de Forcade de Biaix, Prussian colonel (b. 1704)
- January 25
  - Bernardo de Rossi, Italian theologian (b. 1687)
  - Georg Friedrich Schmidt, German artist (b. 1712)
- January 26
  - Domingo de Bonechea, Spanish explorer (b. 1713)
  - Johann Gregor Herold, German painter (b. 1696)
  - Shuja-ud-Daula, Subedar Nawab of Oudh, India (b. 1732)
- January 29 – Henry Willoughby, 16th Baron Willoughby of Parham, Peer in House of Lords (b. 1696)

=== February ===
- February 1 – Nicholas Herbert, British Member of Parliament (b. 1706)
- February 2 – Sir John Rushout, 4th Baronet, British politician (b. 1685)
- February 4 – John Ryder, Irish Anglican bishop (b. 1697)
- February 5 – Eusebius Amort, German Roman Catholic theologian (b. 1692)
- February 6 – William Dowdeswell, British politician (b. 1721)
- February 7 – Mary Butterworth, British counterfeiter in colonial America (b. 1686)
- February 9 – Princess Hejing, manchu princess of the Qing Dynasty (b. 1756)
- February 10 – Claude Pouteau, French surgeon and inventor (b. 1724)
- February 15
  - Peter Dens, Belgian Catholic theologian (b. 1690)
  - Diego Fernández, harpsichord maker of the Spanish court (b. 1703)
- February 16 – Jean-Baptiste Vivien de Châteaubrun, French dramatist and playwright (b. 1686)
- February 24 – Ferdinando Colonna of Stigliano, 2nd Prince of Sonnino (b. 1695)
- February 25 – William Small, Scottish medical doctor and professor of natural philosophy (b. 1734)
- February 28
  - Paul Cardale, British minister (b. 1705)
  - Margaret Coke, Countess of Leicester, British peeress (b. 1700)
  - Empress Xiaoyichun, Qing Dynasty empress (b. 1727)

=== March ===
- March 2 – Nikolaos Doxaras, Greek artist (b. 1710)
- March 3 – Richard Dunthorne, British astronomer (b. 1711)
- March 5 – Pierre-Laurent Buirette de Belloy, French actor and dramatist (b. 1727)
- March 6
  - Job Baster, Dutch naturalist (b. 1711)
  - Gaudenzio Botti, Italian painter (b. 1698)
- March 7
  - John Boyle, 3rd Earl of Glasgow, British Earl (b. 1714)
  - Thomas Nuthall, English lawyer and politician (b. 1720)
- March 20 – Pedro Antonio Barroeta y Ángel, Spanish Catholic priest, Archbishop of Lima, Archbishop of Granada (b. 1701)
- March 21 – Thomas Penn, son of William Penn, founder of the Province of Pennsylvania (b. 1702)
- March 22
  - Peter August, Duke of Schleswig-Holstein-Sonderburg-Beck (b. 1697)
  - Hendrik Carré II, Dutch painter (b. 1696)
- March 23 – Anne Catherine Hoof Green, American printer and publisher (b. 1720)
- March 30
  - William Irby, 1st Baron Boston, British peer (b. 1707)
  - Christian Ditlev Reventlow, Danish Privy Councillor (b. 1710)
- March 31 – Samuel Heathcote, British Member of Parliament (b. 1699)

=== April ===
- April 4 – René Charles de Maupeou, French statesman (b. 1688)
- April 5 – Simon Nikolaus Euseb von Montjoye-Hirsingen, Prince Bishop of Basel (b. 1693)
- April 7 – Sir Anthony Abdy, 5th Baronet, 5th Abdy Baronet (b. 1720)
- April 10
  - Jonas Haas, German-born Danish engraver (b. 1720)
  - Louis-Florent de Vallière, Governor General of the French colony of Saint-Domingue, now Haiti (b. 1721)
- April 11
  - Meletie Covaci, Roman Catholic bishop (b. 1707)
  - Roger Mostyn, English churchman, Canon of Windsor (b. 1720)
- April 12
  - William Kerr, 4th Marquess of Lothian, Scottish nobleman (b. 1710)
  - Pierre Soubeyran, Genevan-French engraver and copperplate engraver (b. 1709)
  - William Vaughan, Welsh politician (b. 1707)
- April 14 – Countess Palatine Ernestine of Sulzbach, Landgravine and Carmelite nun (b. 1697)
- April 16 – William Leyborne Leyborne, governor of the Windward Islands (b. 1744)
- April 19 – Isaac Davis, American gunsmith and militia officer (b. 1745)
- April 24 – Jan Caspar Philips, engraver from the Northern Netherlands (b. 1690)
- April 26 – Josiah Quincy II, American lawyer (b. 1744)
- April 27 – Peter Boehler, Moravian missionary (b. 1712)
- April 30
  - Francesco Barsanti, Italian flautist, oboist and composer (b. 1690)
  - Peter Harrison, English-born colonial American architect (b. 1716)

=== May ===
- May 1 – Israel Lyons, English mathematician and botanist (b. 1739)
- May 2
  - Mary Montagu, Duchess of Montagu, wife of George Brudenell Montagu, Duke of Montagu (b. 1711)
  - Fredericka of Saxe-Gotha-Altenburg, duchess consort of Saxe-Weissenfels (b. 1715)
- May 3 – George Boscawen, British Army general (b. 1712)
- May 5
  - John Blennerhassett, Anglo-Irish politician (b. 1691)
  - Benjamin Dass, Norwegian teacher and book collector (b. 1706)
- May 7 – Cornelius Heinrich Dretzel, German organist and composer (b. 1697)
- May 9
  - Domingo de Basavilbaso, Argentinian businessperson (b. 1709)
  - Vittoria Tesi, Italian opera singer and music teacher (b. 1701)
- May 10
  - Marie Magdalene Charlotte Ackermann, German actress (b. 1757)
  - Caroline Matilda of Great Britain, Queen consort of Denmark and Norway, 1766–1772 (b. 1751)
  - Samuel of Constantinople, Ecumenical Patriarch of Constantinople (b. 1700)
- May 15
  - Hans-Friedrich von Krusemark, Lieutenant General in the Prussian Army of Frederick the Great (b. 1720)
  - Johann Daniel Ritter, German historian (b. 1709)
- May 16 – Ulla von Liewen, Swedish courtier and baroness (b. 1747)
- May 17 – Carlo Carlone, painter (b. 1686)
- May 18
  - Magnus Beronius, Archbishop of Uppsala in the Church of Sweden (b. 1692)
  - Johann Joachim Kändler, German artist (b. 1706)
- May 25 – Karl Gottlieb Guichard, German writer (b. 1724)
- May 27 – Louise Élisabeth de Bourbon, French noblewoman (b. 1693)
- May 28 – Barlow Trecothick, English merchant and politician (b. 1719)
- May 30 – Jean Capperonnier, French classical scholar (b. 1716)

=== June ===
- June 5 – Giovanni Gaetano Bottari, Italian scholar and critic (b. 1689)
- June 6 – Sir Charles Burton, 1st Baronet, Anglo-Irish politician (b. 1702)
- June 11 – Egidio Duni, Italian composer (b. 1708)
- June 15 – Asa Pollard, American soldier (b. 1735)
- June 17
  - Andrew McClary, soldier and major in the Continental Army during the American Revolution (b. 1730)
  - John Pitcairn, British Marine officer during the American Revolutionary War (b. 1722)
  - Joseph Warren, American doctor (b. 1741)
- June 19 – Andrew Barclay, Scottish-American merchant (b. 1719)
- June 21 – Charles, Prince of Nassau-Usingen and Nassau-Saarbrücken (b. 1712)
- June 23
  - James Abercrombie, British army officer, died during the American Revolutionary War (b. 1732)
  - Karl Ludwig von Pöllnitz, German soldier, adventurer and writer (b. 1692)
- June 26 – Aryeh Leib Epstein, Polish rabbi (b. 1708)
- June 27
  - Ignaz Günther, German sculptor and woodcarver (b. 1725)
  - Robert Livingston, member of New York colonial assembly (b. 1688)
- June 29 – Anna Smitshuizen, Dutch prostitute, victim of a cause célèbre murder (b. 1751)
- June 30 – Charles Maynard, 1st Viscount Maynard, British noble (b. 1690)

=== July ===
- July 3 – Thomas Gardner, American politician and colonel (b. 1724)
- July 11 – Simon Boerum, American Continental Congressman (b. 1724)
- July 13
  - Louis Charles, Count of Eu, member of the French Capetian dynasty (b. 1701)
  - John Ratcliffe, English academic, Master of Pembroke College, Oxford (b. 1700)
- July 15 – Servais Duriau, Belgian Cistercian monk (b. 1701)
- July 18 – Joseph Knight, senior Royal Navy officer, served as East Indies Station (b. c. 1708)
- July 20 – Enrico Albrici, Italian painter (b. 1714)
- July 21
  - Robert Bolling, American politician (b. 1738)
  - Szymon Czechowicz, prominent Polish Baroque painter (b. 1689)
- July 22 – Thomas Lockhart, politician (b. 1739)
- July 24 – John Pollen, British Member of Parliament (b. 1702)

=== August ===
- August 4 – Sir Gregory Page, 2nd Baronet, English art collector and landowner (b. 1689)
- August 5 – Maharaja Nandakumar, tax official (b. 1705)
- August 9 – Johann Ernst Gotzkowsky, Prussian merchant, art dealer and diplomat (b. 1710)
- August 10
  - Elihu Adams, soldier in the Continental Army during the American Revolutionary War (b. 1741)
  - César de Missy, Prussian book collector and theologian (b. 1703)
- August 12 – Remember Baker, American soldier, member of the Green Mountain Boys (murdered) (b. 1737)
- August 13 – Michał Fryderyk Czartoryski, Polish nobleman (b. 1696)
- August 14 – Laurens Storm van 's Gravesande, Dutch governor of the colonies of Essequibo and Demerara (b. 1704)
- August 16 – Jakob Langebek, Danish historian (b. 1710)
- August 21 – Zahir al-Umar, Arab ruler of northern Palestine (b. 1689)
- August 25 – Felipe de Castro, Spanish sculptor (b. 1711)
- August 27 – James Burgh, British Whig politician and writer (b. 1714)
- August 28 – James Habersham, Merchant and politician in the British colony of Georgia (b. 1712)
- August 29 – Francesco Sleter, Italian painter (b. 1685)
- August 30 – George Faulkner, Irish publisher and bookseller (b. 1699)

=== September ===
- September 2 – Antoine Touron, French historian (b. 1686)
- September 4 – Al-Mahdi Abbas, Imam of Yemen (b. 1719)
- September 6 – Jean-Baptiste Bullet, French writer (b. 1699)
- September 8 – John Conyers, English politician (b. 1717)
- September 12 – Charles-Louis Mion, French composer (b. 1699)
- September 13
  - Klaas Annink, Dutch serial killer (executed) (b. 1710)
  - Guillaume Mazeas, French physicist (b. 1720)
  - Constantine Phipps, 1st Baron Mulgrave, Irish Baron (b. 1722)
- September 14 – Janusz Aleksander Sanguszko, Court Marshal of Lithuania (b. 1712)
- September 16 – Allen Bathurst, 1st Earl Bathurst, English privy councillor (b. 1684)
- September 17
  - Charles Allanson, British Member of Parliament (b. 1720)
  - John Parker, American colonial farmer, smith and soldier (b. 1729)
- September 21 – Abel Prescott Jr., American Patriot (b. 1749)
- September 23 – John Bentinck, British naval officer, inventor and MP (b. 1737)
- September 24
  - Emanuel Büchel, Swiss graphic artist, aquarellist, topographer and baker (b. 1705)
  - Polixénia Daniel, Hungarian noble and writer (b. 1720)
- September 28 – Ukawsaw Gronniosaw, writer and enslaved man (b. 1710)

=== October ===
- October 2 – Fukuda Chiyo-ni, Japanese haiku poet and Buddhist nun (b. 1703)
- October 3 – Cluer Dicey, English newspaper proprietor and patent medicine vendor (b. 1715)
- October 5 – Amos Adams, Anglican clergy (b. 1728)
- October 10 – Louis Nicolas Victor de Félix d'Ollières, Marshal of France (b. 1711)
- October 13 – James Cholmondeley, British Army officer, Member of Parliament (b. 1708)
- October 14 – Gilles Joubert, French master cabinetmaker (b. 1689)
- October 16
  - Peter van Hurk, Danish merchant (b. 1697)
  - Antti Piimänen, Finnish churchbuilder (b. 1712)
- October 18
  - Michael Cresap, Continental Army officer (b. 1742)
  - Paul of the Cross, Italian mystic (b. 1694)
  - Christian August Crusius, German philosopher and theologian (b. 1715)
- October 20 – Sir John Molesworth, 5th Baronet, British Member of Parliament (b. 1729)
- October 21
  - François-Hubert Drouais, French painter (b. 1727)
  - Maria Wilhelmina von Neipperg, Mistress of Austrian royalty (b. 1738)
  - Sakai Tadamochi, 酒井忠用 Daimyo (b. 1723)
- October 22 – Peyton Randolph, planter and public official from the Colony of Virginia (b. 1721)
- October 27 – Johan Maurits Mohr, Dutch-German pastor and astronomer (b. 1716)
- October 29 – Gabriel François Venel, French chemist (b. 1723)

=== November ===
- November 1 – Pierre-Joseph Bernard, French writer (b. 1708)
- November 2 – Noble Jones, British American politician (b. 1702)
- November 3 – Juan José Pérez Hernández, Spanish explorer (b. 1725)
- November 5
  - Tysoe Hancock, English medical doctor (b. 1723)
  - Christian IV, Count Palatine of Zweibrücken, German noble (b. 1722)
  - Luis Jayme, Spanish-born Franciscan (b. 1740)
- November 6
  - Peter Burrell, British politician (b. 1724)
  - Guillaume de Barrême de Châteaufort, French painter (b. 1719)
- November 7
  - Johann Gottfried Hildebrandt, organ builder (b. 1724)
  - François Rebel, French composer (b. 1701)
- November 9 – Francisco Ximénez de Tejada, Spanish knight, 69th Grandmaster of the Knights Hospitaller (b. 1703)
- November 12 – John Smith, English politician (b. 1727)
- November 13 – Jeanne Camus de Pontcarré, French aristocrat and eccentric widow (b. 1705)
- November 21 – John Hill, English author and botanist (b. 1716)
- November 22 – Claude-Henri de Fusée de Voisenon, French dramatist and writer (b. 1708)
- November 24 – Lorenzo Ricci, Superior General of the Society of Jesus (b. 1703)
- November 25
  - Jacob Benzon, Norwegian judge (b. 1688)
  - Richard Spry, British Royal Navy officer, North America and West Indies Station (b. 1715)
- November 28 – Thomas Elfe, British cabinet-maker (b. 1719)
- November 29 – Juan Curiel, Spanish intellectual and politician (b. 1690)

=== December ===
- December 3 – Giovanni Bianchi, Italian medical doctor and zoologist (b. 1693)
- December 7
  - Charles Saunders, British politician (b. 1715)
  - Fabrizio Serbelloni, Catholic cardinal (b. 1695)
- December 8 – Josef Ignaz Mildorfer, Austrian painter (b. 1719)
- December 9
  - Pietro Gnocchi, Italian composer (b. 1689)
  - Robert Livingston, landowner and politician in Colonial America (b. 1718)
- December 15
  - Marie-Angélique Memmie Le Blanc, French feral child (b. 1712)
  - Princess Tarakanova, Pretender to the Russian throne (b. 1753)
- December 16 – Gustavus Hamilton, Irish painter (b. 1739)
- December 20 – Sigismund Streit, German art collector (b. 1687)
- December 21 – Theresa Parker, English art patron (b. 1745)
- December 28
  - John Campbell, Scottish author (b. 1708)
  - Petrus Albertus van der Parra, Dutch colonial governor (b. 1714)
  - John Phillips, English master carpenter and architect (b. 1709)
- December 31
  - Richard Montgomery, American general (killed in battle) (b. 1738)
  - Anna Vorontsova, Russian lady-in-waiting (b. 1722)
- Date unknown – Sarah Buttall, English silversmith

1776

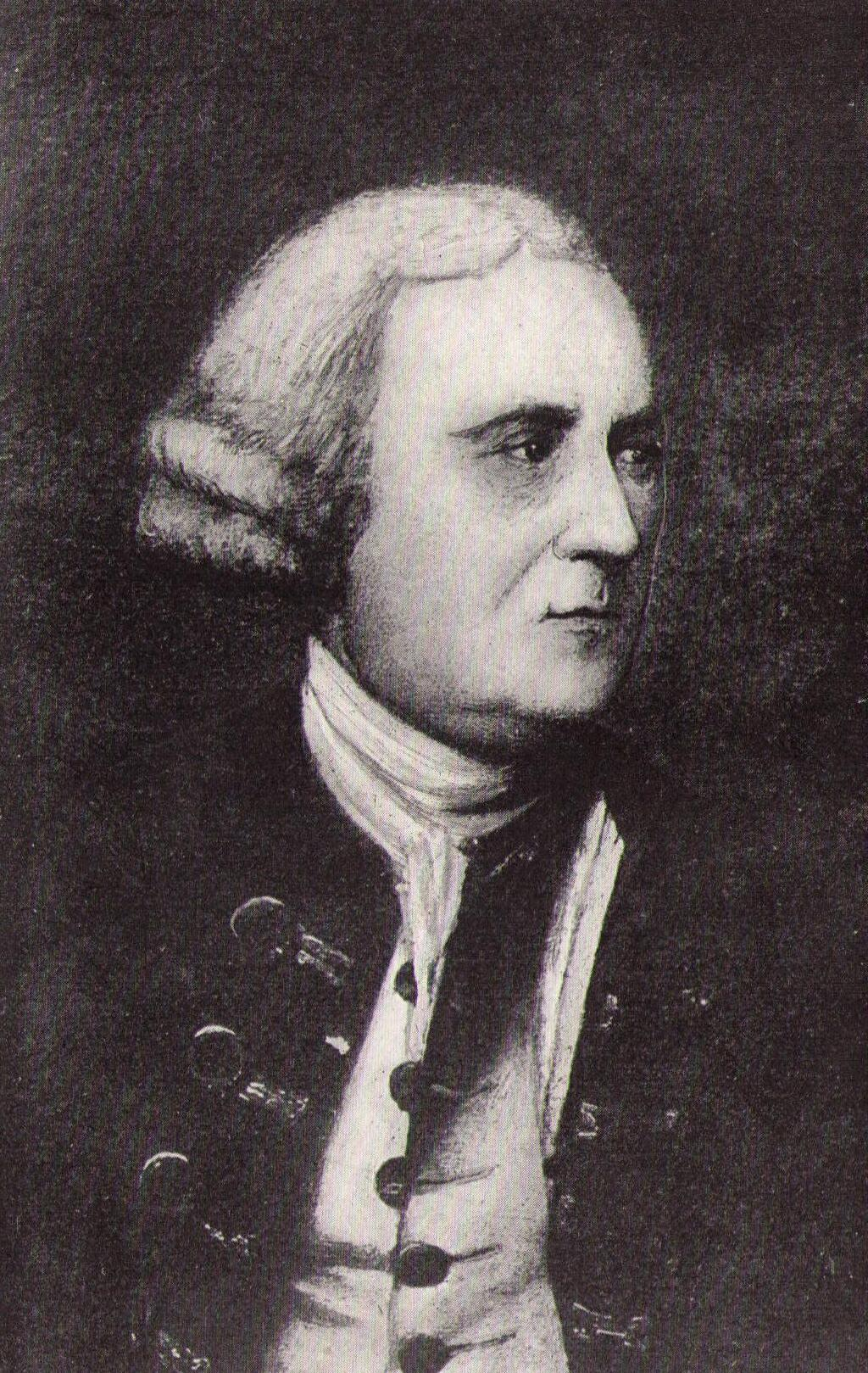
James Gabriel Montresor

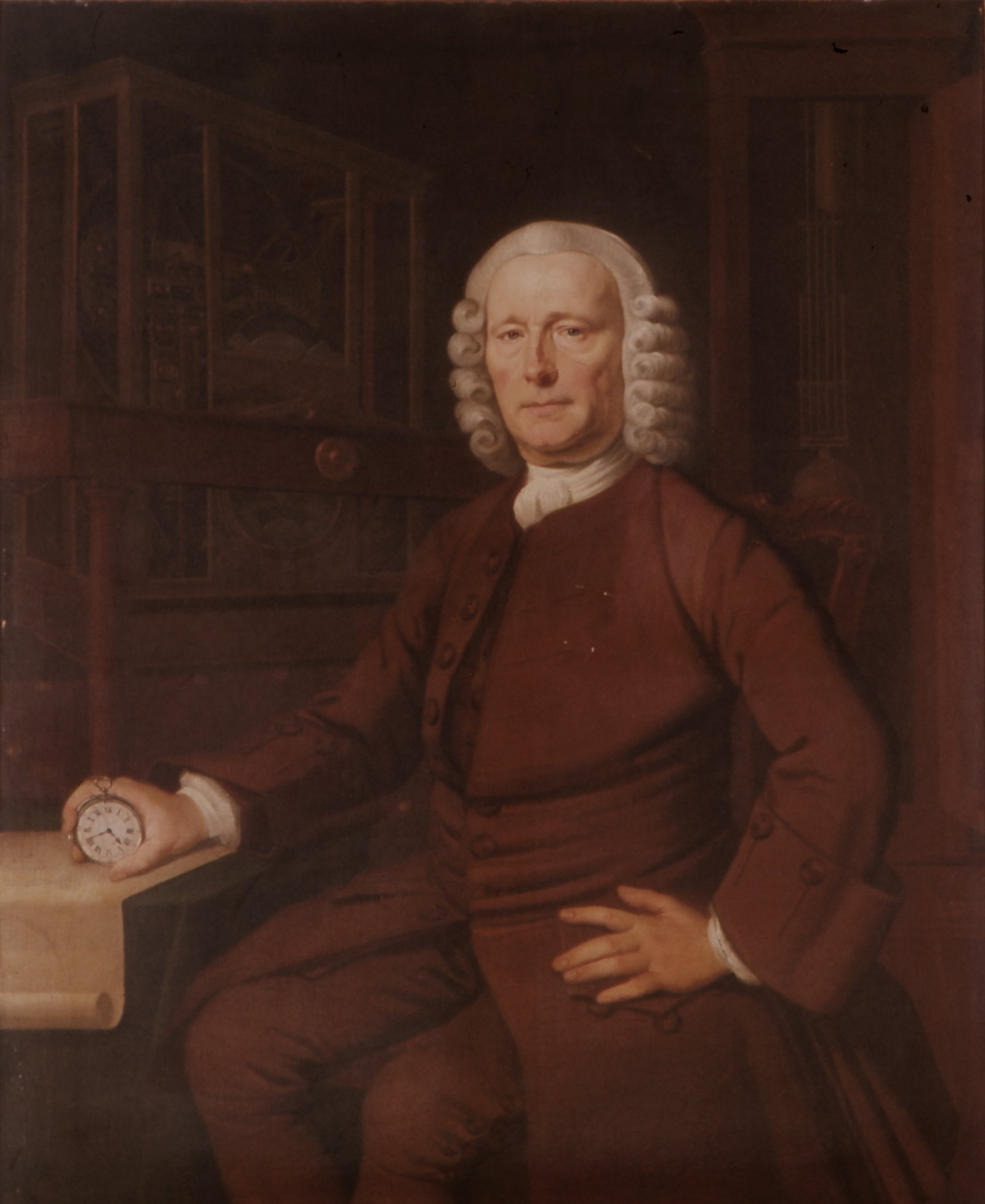
John Harrison

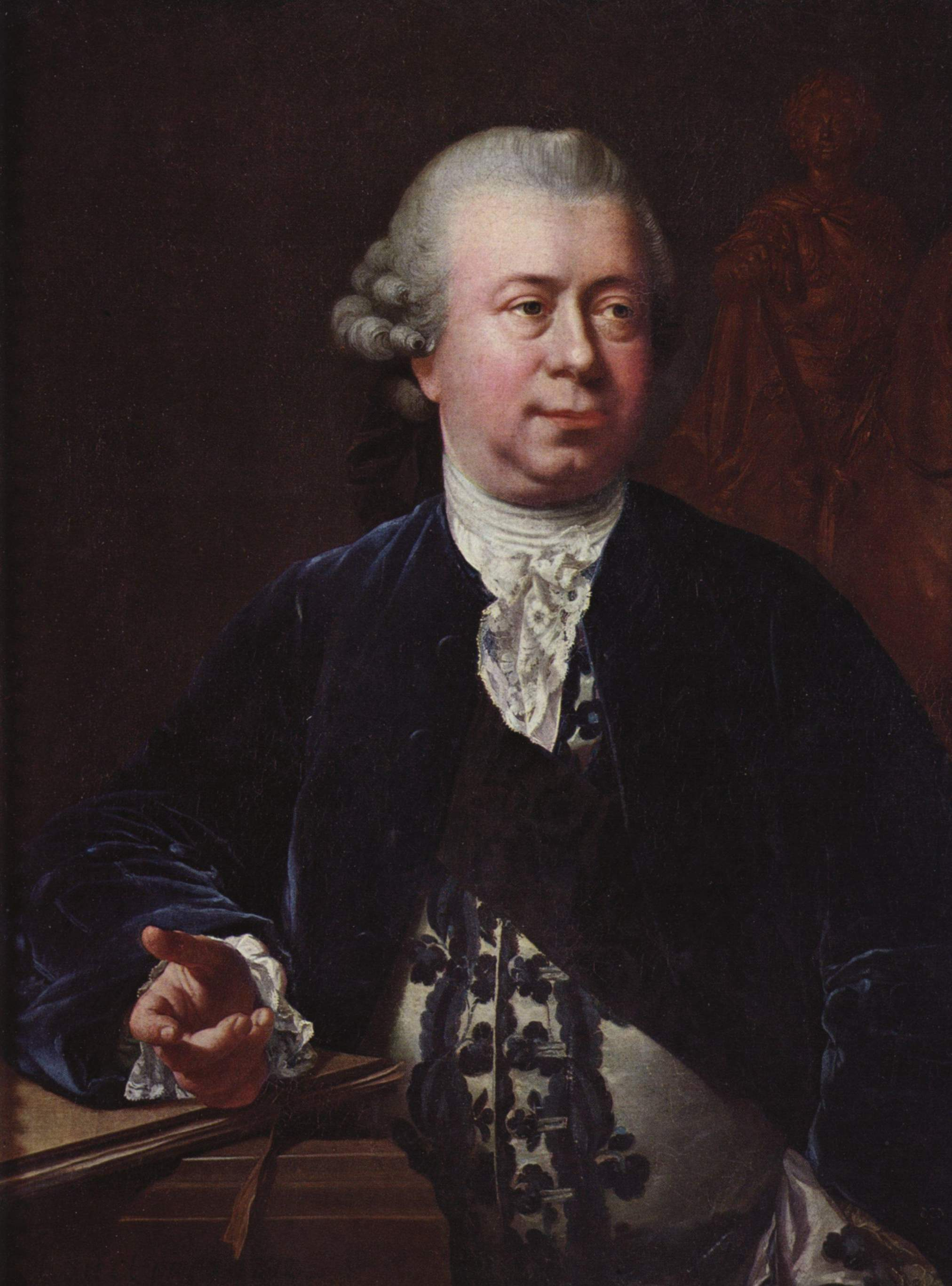
Jacques Saly

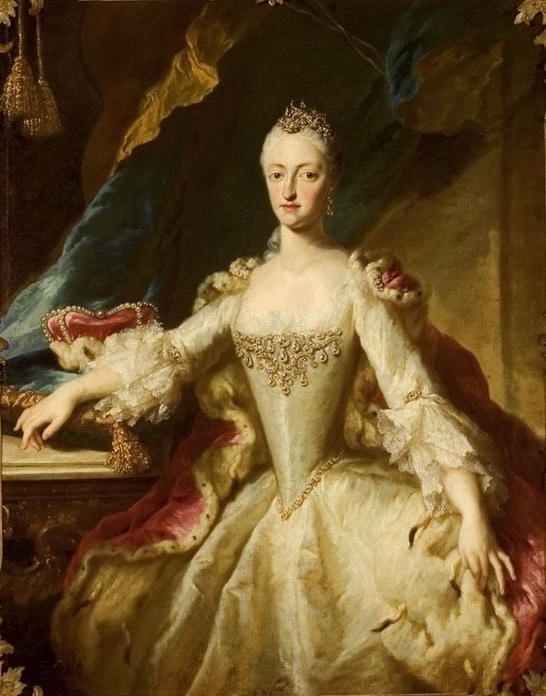
Duchess Maria Anna Josepha of Bavaria

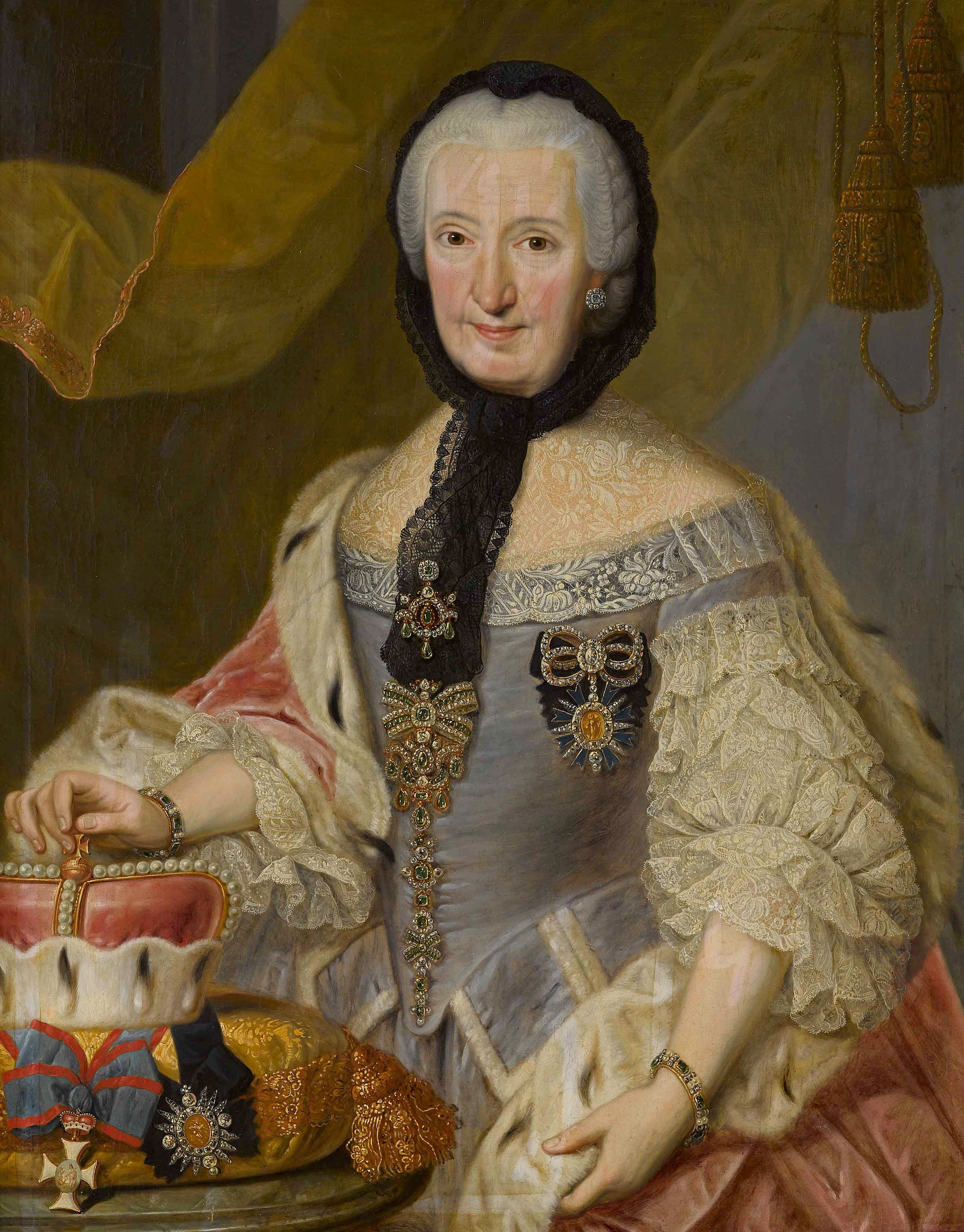
Countess Palatine Francisca Christina of Sulzbach

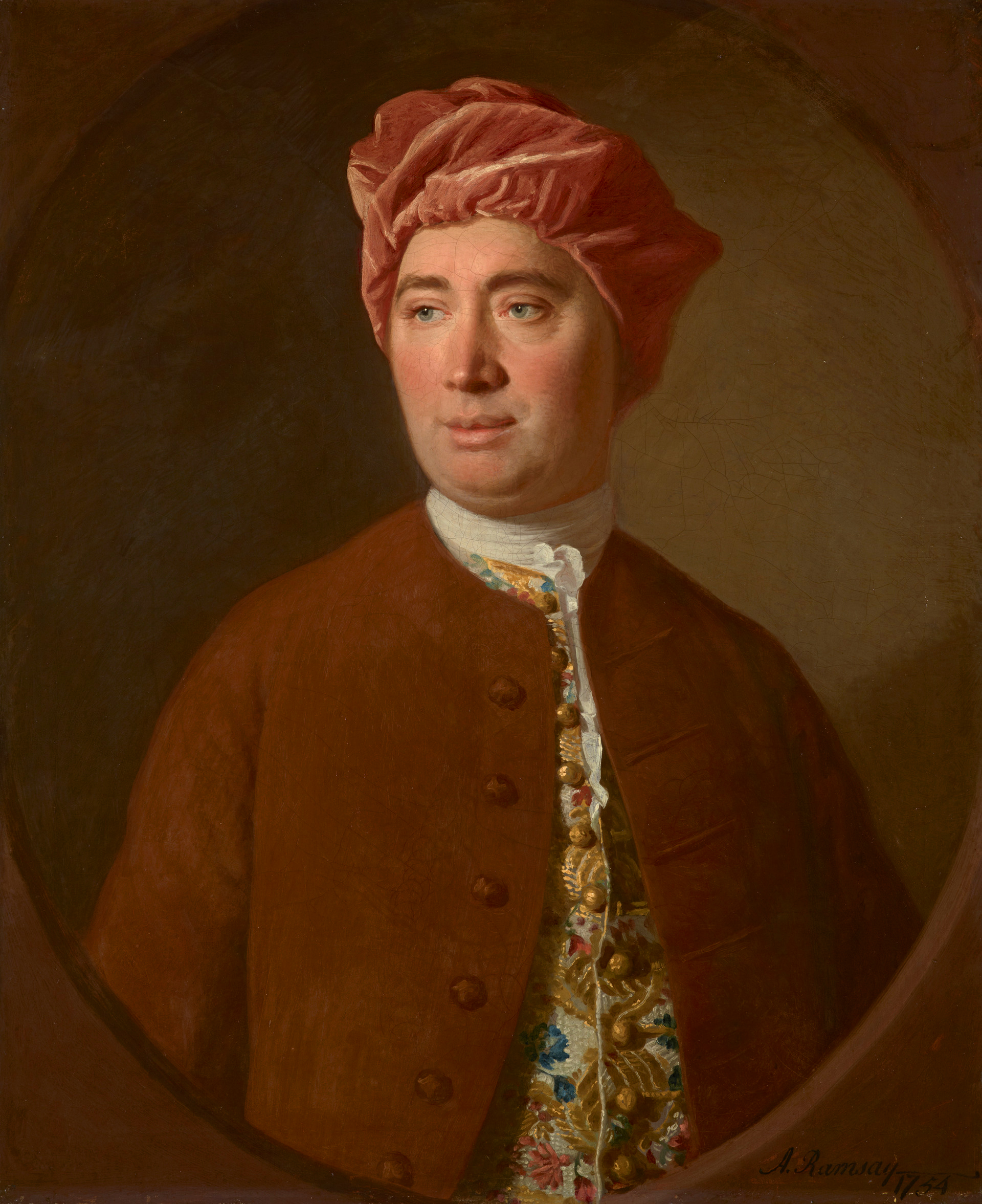
David Hume

- January 6 – James Gabriel Montresor, British military engineer (b. 1704)
- January 8 – James Frye, colonial soldier (b. 1709)
- January 12 – Johann Philipp Murray, German historian interested in early Nordic studies and relations between England and Scandinavia (b. 1726)
- January 14 – Edward Cornwallis, British military officer, first Governor of Nova Scotia (b. 1713)
- January 21 – Jacques de Romas, French physicist (b. 1713)
- February 13 – Élisabeth Catherine Ballard (b. 1704)
- February 18 – Lady Anne Monson, English botanist (b. 1726)
- March 4 – Johann Georg Ziesenis, German – Danish portrait painter (b. 1716)
- March 5 – Pierre-Robert Le Cornier de Cideville, French magistrate and scholar (b. 1693)
- March 7 – John Bowes, 9th Earl of Strathmore and Kinghorne (b. 1737)
- March 10
  - Élie Catherine Fréron, French critic (b. 1719)
  - Niclas Sahlgren, Swedish merchant, philanthropist (b. 1701)
- March 24 – John Harrison, English clockmaker (b. 1693)
- March 26 – Samuel Ward, American politician (b. 1725)
- March 29 – Johann Gotthelf Lindner, German university teacher and writer (b. 1729)
- March 30 – Jonathan Belcher, British-American lawyer (b. 1710)
- March 31 – Jane Randolph Jefferson, wife of Peter Jefferson and the mother of US president Thomas Jefferson (b. 1720)
- April 7 – Charles-Pierre Colardeau, French poet (b. 1732)
- April 19 – Jacob Emden, leading German rabbi and talmudist who championed Orthodox Judaism (b. 1697)
- April 20 – Olivier de Vézin (b. 1707)
- April 29 – Edward Wortley Montagu, English traveller and writer (b. 1713)
- May 4 – Jacques Saly, French sculptor (b. 1717)
- May 6 – James Kent, English organist and composer (b. 1700)
- May 7 – Duchess Maria Anna Josepha of Bavaria, Duchess of Bavaria by birth and Margravine of Baden-Baden by marriage (b. 1734)
- May 23 – Jeanne Julie Éléonore de Lespinasse, French salon holder (b. 1732)
- May 25 – Richard FitzWilliam, 6th Viscount FitzWilliam (b. 1711)
- May 30 – Albert Frick, German theologian (b. 1714)
- June 2 – Continental Army General John Thomas, from smallpox (b. 1724)
- June 10
  - Hsinbyushin (b. 1736)
  - Leopold Widhalm, Austrian luthier (b. 1722)
- June 13 – Elizabeth Scott, British-American poet and Christian hymnwriter (b. 1708)
- June 20 – Benjamin Huntsman, English inventor, manufacturer (b. 1704)
- July 7 – Jeremiah Markland, English classical scholar (b. 1693)
- July 10 – Richard Peters, English-born American clergyman (b. 1704)
- July 15 – Richard Bampfylde, British politician (b. 1722)
- July 16 – Countess Palatine Francisca Christina of Sulzbach, Princess-abbess of Essen Abbey and Thorn Abbey (b. 1696)
- July 21 – Benedicta Margareta von Löwendal, German industrialist (b. 1683)
- August 1
  - Edward Bentham, Oxford based theologian who in 1763 (b. 1707)
  - Francis Salvador, American patriot (b. 1747)
- August 2 – Louis François, Prince of Conti, French military leader (b. 1717)
- August 14 – Charles Cathcart, 9th Lord Cathcart (b. 1721)
- August 25 – David Hume, Scottish philosopher (b. 1711)
- August 27 – William Stark, Revolutionary War era officer (b. 1724)
- August 29 – Joseph Arnold, pre-revolutionary resident of North Kingstown and Exeter (b. 1710)
- September 1 – Angelica Le Gru Perotti, Italian woman painter of the Rococo (b. 1719)
- September 6 – Chamaraja Wodeyar VIII, twentieth maharaja of the Kingdom of Mysore from 1770 to 1776 (b. 1759)
- September 22 – Nathan Hale, American Revolutionary War captain, writer and patriot (executed) (b. 1755)
- September 24 – Charles Cadogan, 2nd Baron Cadogan, Anglo-Irish peer (b. 1685)
- September 28 – Cadwallader Colden, physician (b. 1688)
- October 3 – Ayşe Sultan, Ottoman princess (b. 1713)
- October 10 – Karl Gotthelf von Hund, German Freemason (b. 1722)
- October 15 – John Ellis, naturalist (b. 1710)
- October 17 – Pierre François le Courayer, French theologian (b. 1681)
- October 28 – Princess Sophie of Saxe-Hildburghausen, Princess of Saxe-Hildburghausen by birth (b. 1760)
- October 30 – Simón de Anda y Salazar, Spanish Basque governor of the Philippines from July (b. 1709)
- November 15 – Fernando de Silva, 12th Duke of Alba, Spanish duke (b. 1714)
- November 17 – James Ferguson, Scottish astronomer (b. 1710)
- November 23 – Théophile de Bordeu, French physician (b. 1722)
- December 5 – Elizabeth Percy, Duchess of Northumberland, British duchess; Lady of the Bedchamber (b. 1716)
- December 10 – Robert Hay Drummond, Archbishop of York (b. 1711)
- December 13 – Victor-Thérèse Charpentier (b. 1732)
- December 25 – John Gabriel Jones, colonial American pioneer and politician (b. 1752)
- date unknown – Muhammad al-Warghi, Tunisian writer and poet (b. c. 1713)

1777

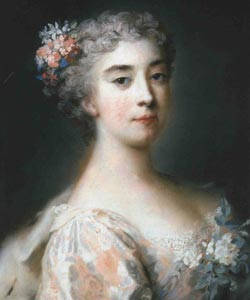
Enrichetta d'Este

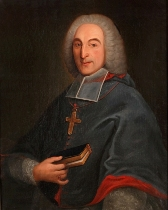
Pierre-Herman Dosquet

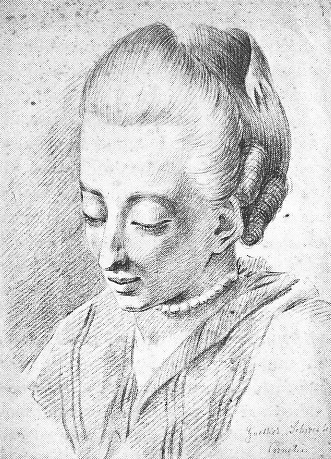
Cornelia Schlosser

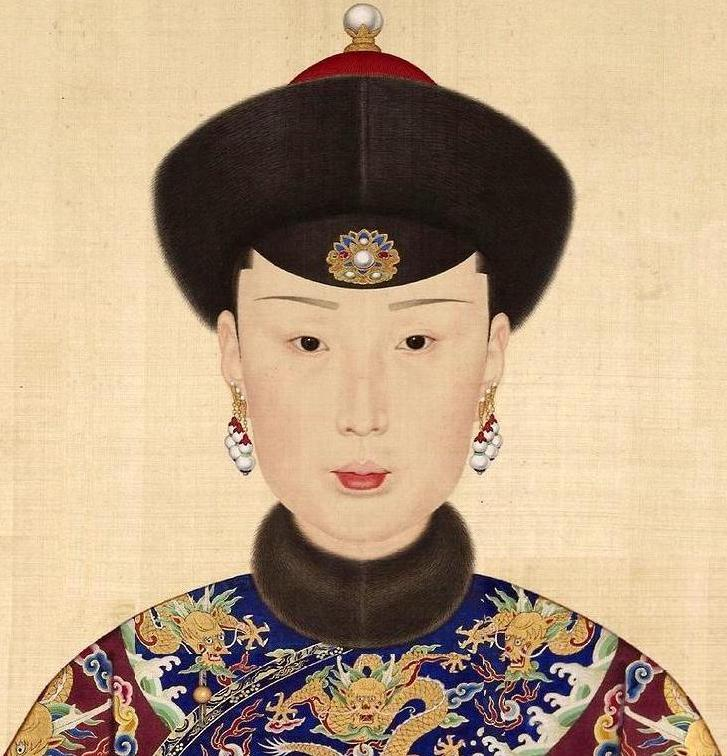
Consort Shu

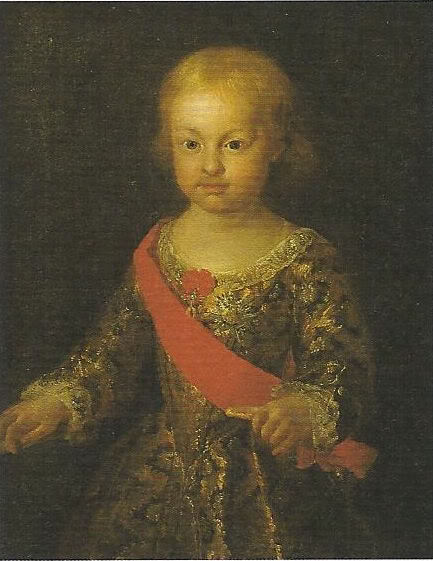
Infante Philip, Duke of Calabria

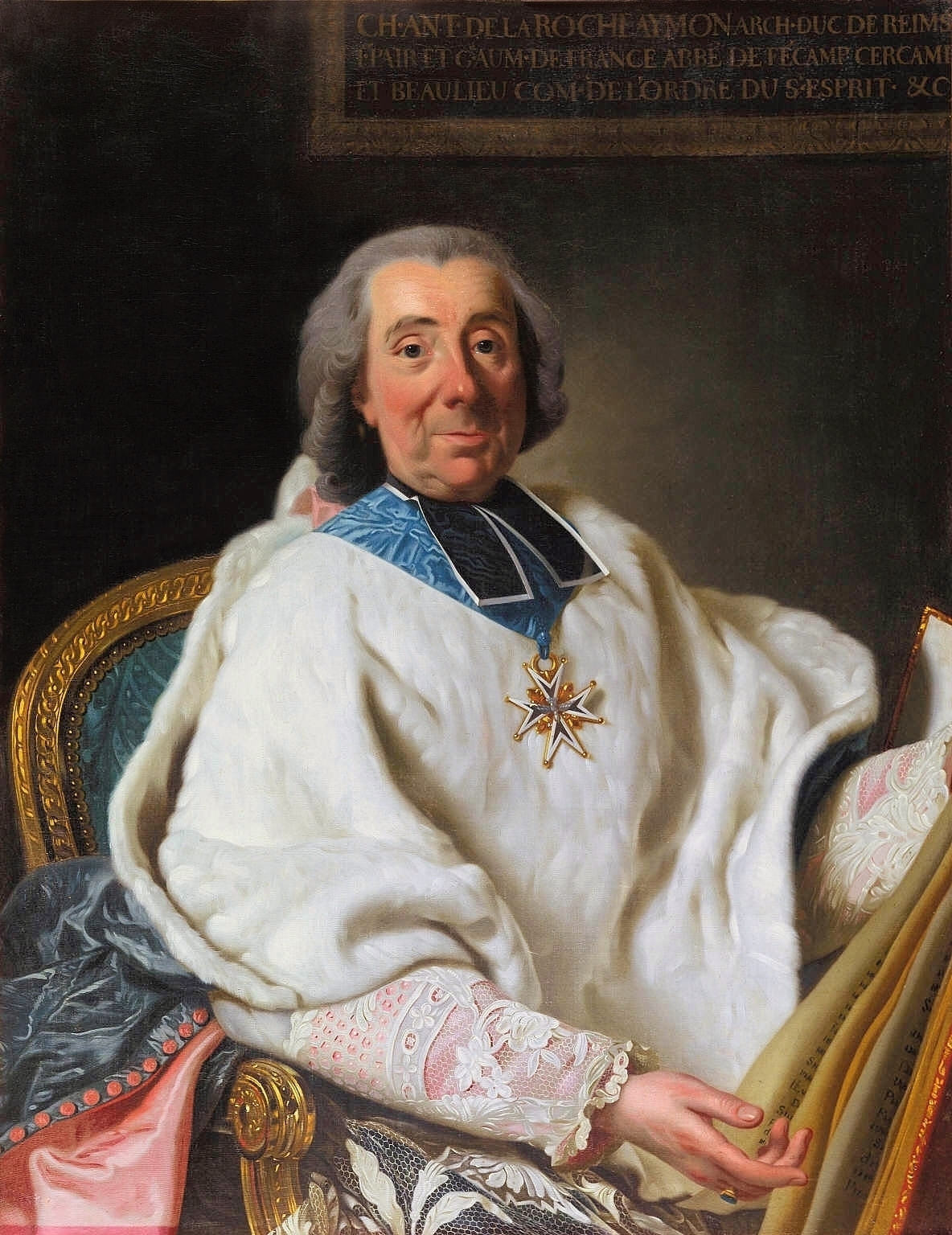
Charles Antoine de La Roche-Aymon

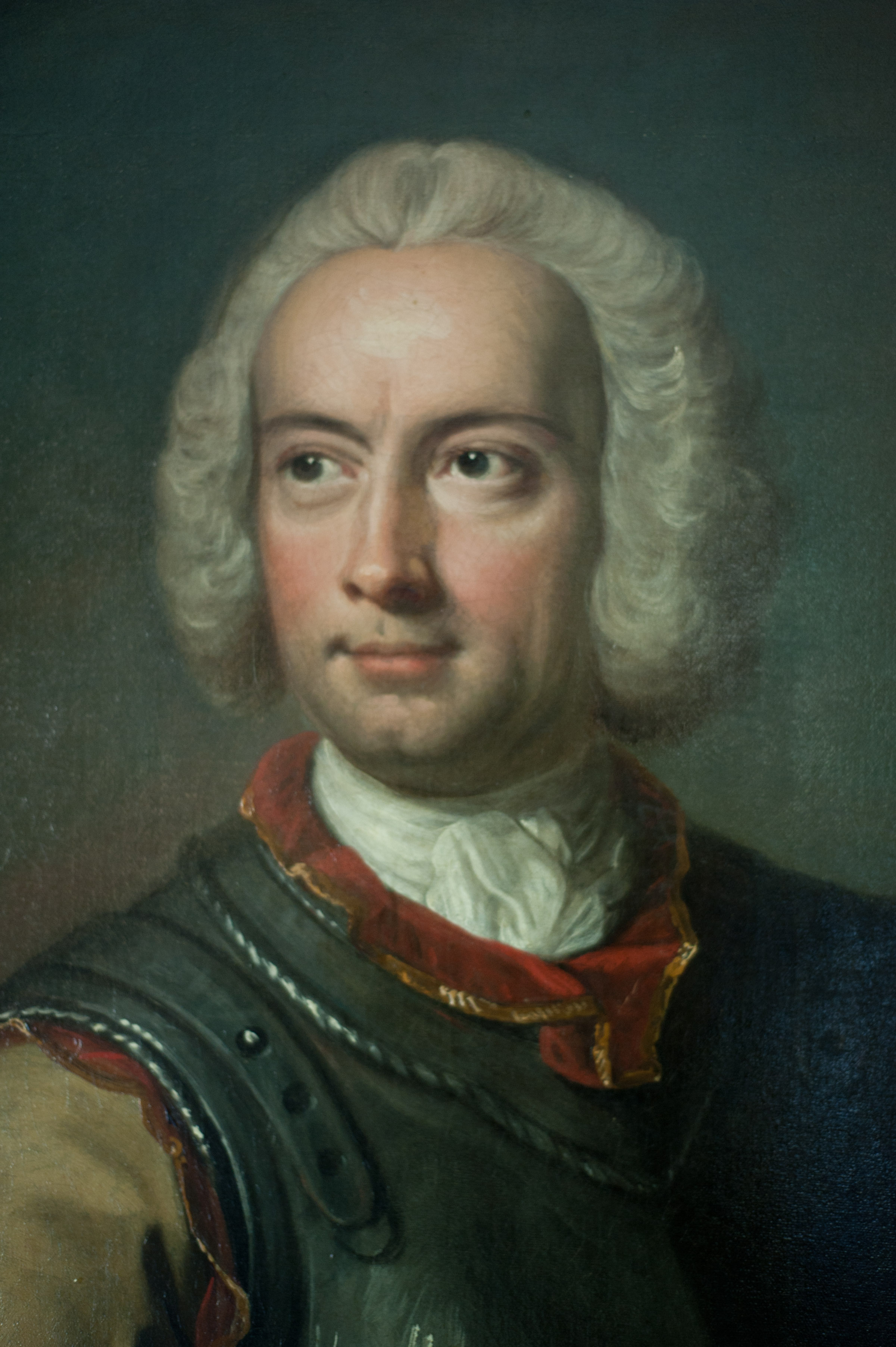
Sir Charles Knowles, 1st Baronet

=== January–March ===
- January 10 – Spranger Barry, Irish actor (b. 1719)
- January 12 – Hugh Mercer, American Revolutionary War officer, mortally wounded in battle (b. 1726)
- January 13 – James Rait, Anglican clergyman, Scottish Episcopal Church Bishop of Brechin 1742–1777 (b. 1689)
- January 27 – Hubert de Brienne, French naval commander (b. 1690)
- January 30 – Enrichetta d'Este, Duchess of Parma (b. 1702)
- February 9
  - Captain Abraham Godwin, American marine on USS Washington (1776 row galley) (b. 1724)
  - Seth Pomeroy, American gunsmith and soldier (b. 1706)
- February 11 – Sir Gilbert Elliot, 3rd Baronet, of Minto, Scottish statesman, philosopher and poet (b. 1722)
- February 24 – King Joseph I of Portugal (b. 1714)
- February 28 – Joab Hoisington, American major (b. 1736)
- March 1
  - Józef Aleksander Jabłonowski, Polish nobleman (szlachcic) (b. 1711)
  - Georg Christoph Wagenseil, Austrian composer (b. 1715)
- March 2 – Empress Xiaoshengxian, mother of the Chinese Qianlong Emperor of China (b. 1692)
- March 4 – Pierre-Herman Dosquet, 4th bishop of Quebec (b. 1691)
- March 6 – Jeremias Friedrich Reuß, German theologian (b. 1700)
- March 10 – John the Painter, British criminal (b. 1752)
- March 20 – Jean-François-Joseph de Rochechouart, French Roman Catholic Cardinal (b. 1708)
- March 23 – Sir Hugh Paterson, 2nd Baronet, Scottish Jacobite and Member of the Parliament of Great Britain (b. 1685)
- March 31 – Richard Terrick, Church of England clergyman, Bishop of Peterborough 1757–1764 and Bishop of London 1764–1777 (b. 1710)

=== April–June ===
- April 7 – Anna Chamber, British noblewoman and poet (b. 1709)
- April 29 – Antonio Joli, Italian painter of vedute and capricci (b. 1700)
- May 5 – Raphael Hayyim Isaac Carregal, Palestinian rabbi preaching in the Americas (b. 1733)
- May 7 – Jean-Baptiste Nicolas Roch de Ramezay, marine captain and colonial administrator in New France (b. 1708)
- May 9 – Heneage Finch, 3rd Earl of Aylesford, Member of the Parliament of Great Britain (b. 1715)
- May 11 – George Pigot, 1st Baron Pigot, British governor of Madras (b. 1719)
- May 19 – Button Gwinnett, a signatory of the American Declaration of Independence (b. 1735)
- May 22 – David Wooster, American general in the French and Indian War and in the American Revolutionary War (b. 1711)
- May 28 – William Douglas, American military officer, leading regiments from Connecticut in the American Revolutionary War (b. 1742)
- May 31 – Henry Fane of Wormsley, English politician (b. 1703)
- June 8 – Cornelia Schlosser, sister and only sibling of Johann Wolfgang von Goethe to survive to adulthood (b. 1750)
- June 21 – Georg Friedrich Meier, German philosopher and aesthetician (b. 1718)

=== July–September ===
- July 4 – Consort Shu, consort of the Chinese Qianlong Emperor (b. 1728)
- July 13 – Guillaume Coustou the Younger, French artist (b. 1716)
- August 14
  - Karl Wilhelm von Dieskau, Prussian lieutenant general and general inspector of the artillery (b. 1701)
  - Otto Magnus von Schwerin, Prussian general in the army of Frederick the Great (b. 1701)
- August 23 – Celia Grillo Borromeo, Italian scientist, mathematician (b. 1684)
- August 30 – John Clavering, British Army officer (b. 1722)
- September 7 – Tekle Haymanot II, emperor of Ethiopia (b. 1754)
- September 16 – Simon Harcourt, 1st Earl Harcourt, English landowner, diplomat, general and Viceroy of India (b. 1714)
- September 18 – Princess Amalia of Nassau-Dietz, wife of Frederick (b. 1710)
- September 19 – Infante Philip, Duke of Calabria (b. 1747)
- September 20 – Edward Howard, 9th Duke of Norfolk, British peer (b. 1686)
- September 22 – John Bartram, American botanist (b. 1699)
- September 25 – Johann Heinrich Lambert, Swiss mathematician, physicist and astronomer (b. 1728)

=== October–December ===
- October 3 – Jeremias van Riemsdijk, Dutch colonial governor (b. 1712)
- October 4 – Francis Nash, American brigadier general, killed at the Battle of Germantown (b. c. 1742)
- October 6 – Marie Thérèse Rodet Geoffrin, French salon holder (b. 1699)
- October 7 – Simon Fraser of Balnain, Scottish general during the American Revolutionary War, killed in battle (b. 1729)
- October 21 – Samuel Foote, English dramatist and actor (b. 1720)
- October 22 – Friedrich Baum, German dragoon Lieutenant Colonel of Brunswick in British service during the American Revolutionary War (b. 1748)
- October 25 – Carl von Donop, Hessian colonel fighting in the American Revolutionary War (b. 1732)
- October 27 – Charles Antoine de La Roche-Aymon, French cardinal-archbishop and Grand Almoner (b. 1697)
- October 30 – John Hart, American militia officer during King George's War and the French and Indian War (b. 1706)
- November 1 – Jonathan Hampton, American colonial surveyor (b. 1712)
- November 6 – Bernard de Jussieu, French naturalist (b. 1699)
- November 10 – Cornstalk, Shawnee chief (b. c. 1720)
- November 13 – William Bowyer, English printer (b. 1699)
- November 17 – Pratap Singh Shah, 2nd king of Nepal (b. 1751)
- November 18 – Thomas Foley, 1st Baron Foley, English landowner and politician (b. 1716)
- December 9 – Sir Charles Knowles, 1st Baronet, British Royal Navy officer (b. c. 1704)
- December 12 – Albrecht von Haller, Swiss anatomist and physiologist (b. 1708)
- December 25 – Charles Chauncey, English physician (b. 1706)
- December 26
  - Dolly Pentreath, last-known fluent native speaker of the Cornish language (b. 1692)
  - Ricardo Wall, Spanish-Irish cavalry officer (b. 1694)
- December 27 – Frederick Keppel, Church of England clergyman (b. 1728)
- December 30 – Maximilian III Joseph, Elector of Bavaria, Prince-elector of the Holy Roman Empire and Duke of Bavaria 1745–1777 (b. 1727)

1778

- January 3 – Paul Jacques Malouin, French chemist (b. 1701)

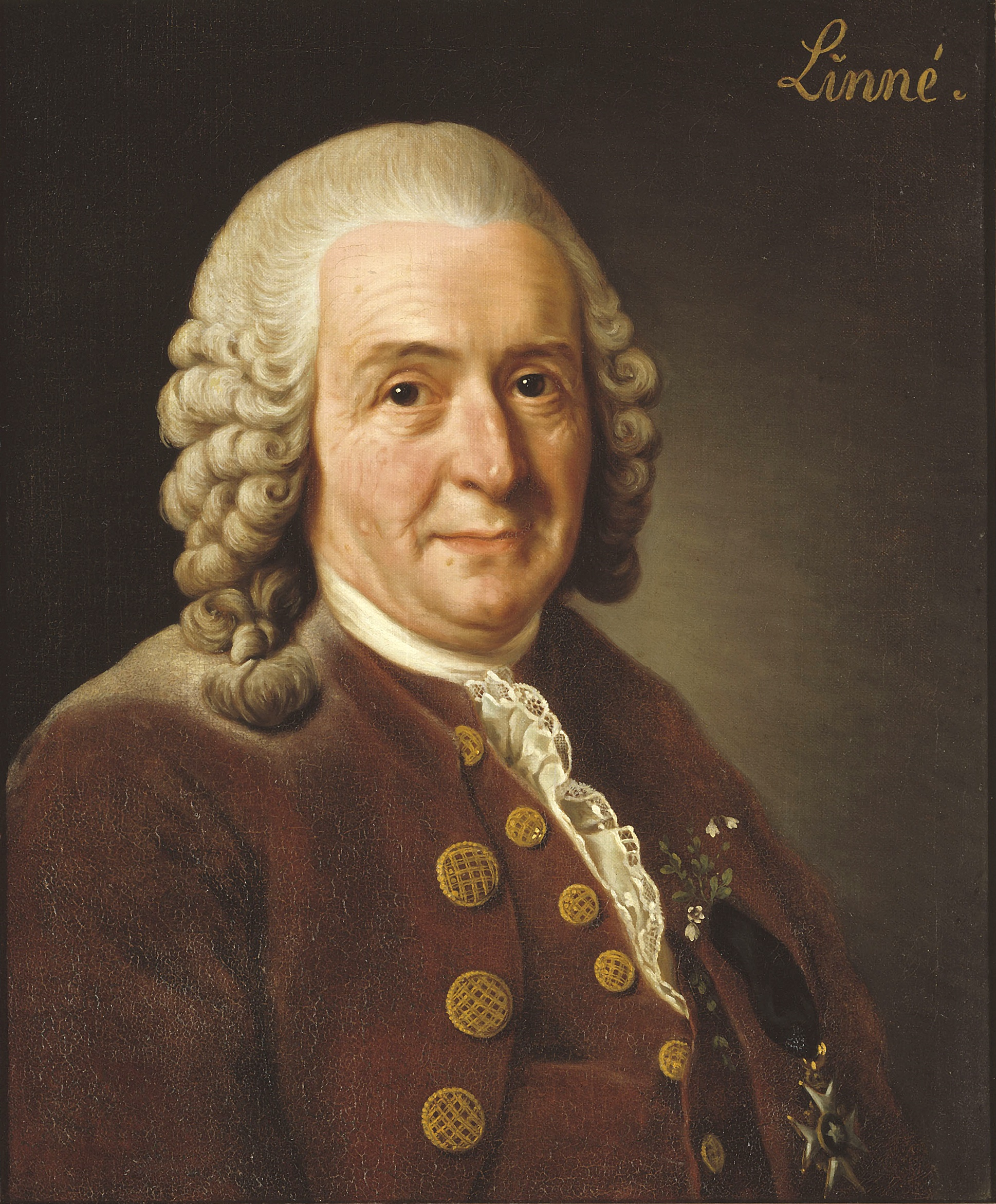
Carl Linnaeus

- January 10 – Carl Linnaeus, Swedish botanist (b. 1707)
- February 18 – Joseph Marie Terray, French statesman (b. 1715)
- February 20 – Laura Bassi, Italian physicist and academic (b. 1711)
- February 27 – Alexander Murray of Elibank, fourth son of Alexander Murray (b. 1712)
- March 5 – Thomas Arne, English composer of Rule, Britannia! (b. 1710)
- March 7 – Charles De Geer, Swedish industrialist and entomologist (b. 1720)
- March 13 – Charles le Beau, French historian (b. 1701)
- April 8 – Pieter Teyler van der Hulst, Dutch businessman (b. 1702)
- April 22 – James Hargreaves, English weaver, carpenter, and inventor (b. 1720)
- May 8 – Lorenz Christoph Mizler, German music historian, polymath (b. 1711)
- May 11 – William Pitt, 1st Earl of Chatham, Prime Minister of Great Britain (b. 1708)
- May 12 – Paul-Joseph Le Moyne de Longueuil, seigneur and colonial army officer in New France, governor of Trois-Rivières (b. 1701)
- May 16 – Robert Darcy, 4th Earl of Holderness, English diplomat and politician (b. 1718)

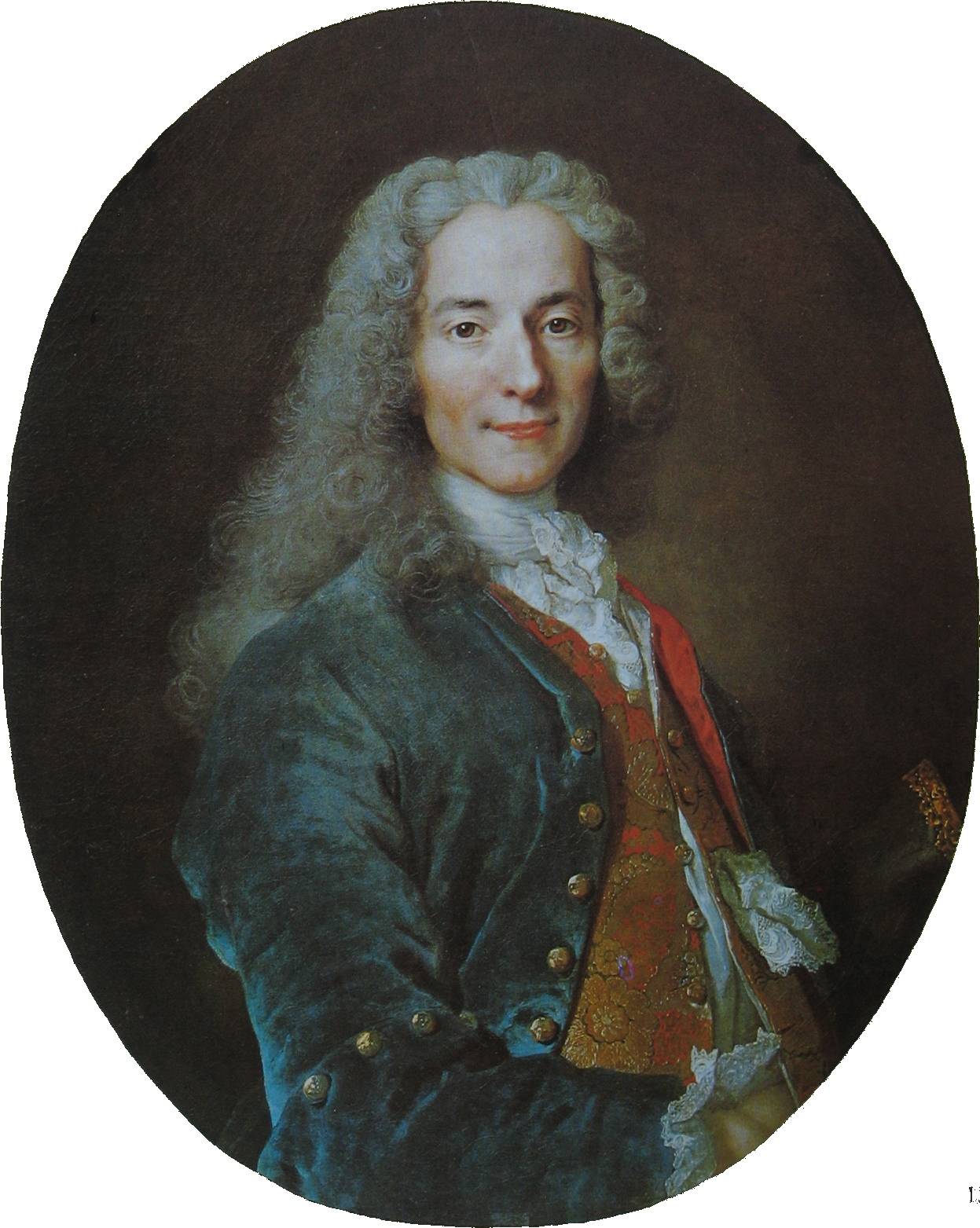
Voltaire

- May 30
  - José de la Borda, Spanish/Mexican mining magnate (b. c. 1699)
  - Voltaire, French philosopher (b. 1694)
- June 12 – Philip Livingston, American signer of the Declaration of Independence (b. 1716)
- June 16 – Konrad Ekhof, German actor (b. 1720)
- June 19 – Francesca Cuzzoni, Italian operatic soprano (b. 1696)
- June 24 – Pieter Burman the Younger, Dutch philologist (b. 1714)

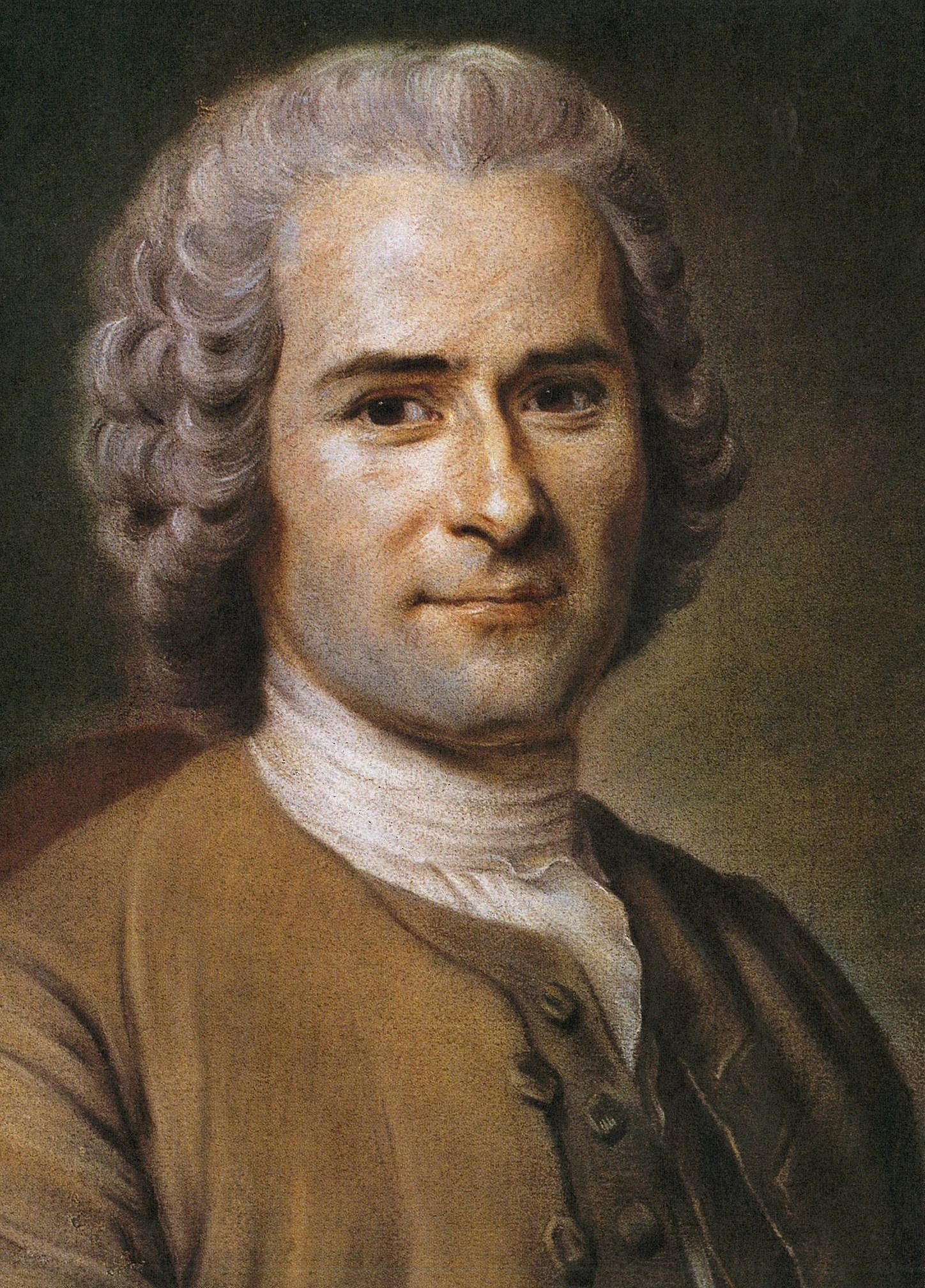
Jean-Jacques Rousseau

- July 3
  - Jean-Jacques Rousseau, Swiss philosopher (b. 1712)
  - Bathsheba Spooner, American murderer (b. c. 1746)
- July 3 – Anna Maria Mozart, Austrian mother to the Mozarts (b. 1720)
- July 4 – Ebenezer Kinnersley, American scientist (b. 1711)
- August 5 – Charles Clémencet, French historian (b. 1703)
- August 7 – Sir Thomas Cave, 5th Baronet of England (b. 1712)
- August 12 – Peregrine Bertie, 3rd Duke of Ancaster and Kesteven, British general, politician (b. 1714)
- August 26 – Johan Augustin Mannerheim, Swedish nobleman and military leader (b. 1706)
- October 1 – Washington Shirley, 5th Earl Ferrers, British Royal Navy admiral (b. 1722)
- October 6 – George Hay, British politician (b. 1715)
- October 11 – Saliha Sultan, daughter of Ottoman Sultan (b. 1715)
- October 24 – Henry Ernest of Stolberg-Wernigerode, German politician, provost and author (b. 1716)
- November 9
  - Giovanni Battista Piranesi, Italian artist (b. 1720)
  - Lydia Taft, American suffragist (b. 1712)
- November 11 – Anne Steele, English hymnwriter and essayist (b. 1717)
- November 20 – Francesco Cetti, Italian Jesuit scientist (b. 1726)
- December 26 – Pedro Antonio de Cevallos, Spanish military Governor of Buenos Aires (1757–1766) (b. 1715)
- December 30 – Constantine, Landgrave of Hesse-Rotenburg (b. 1716)
- date unknown – Thomas Johnson, English furniture maker (b. 1714)

1779

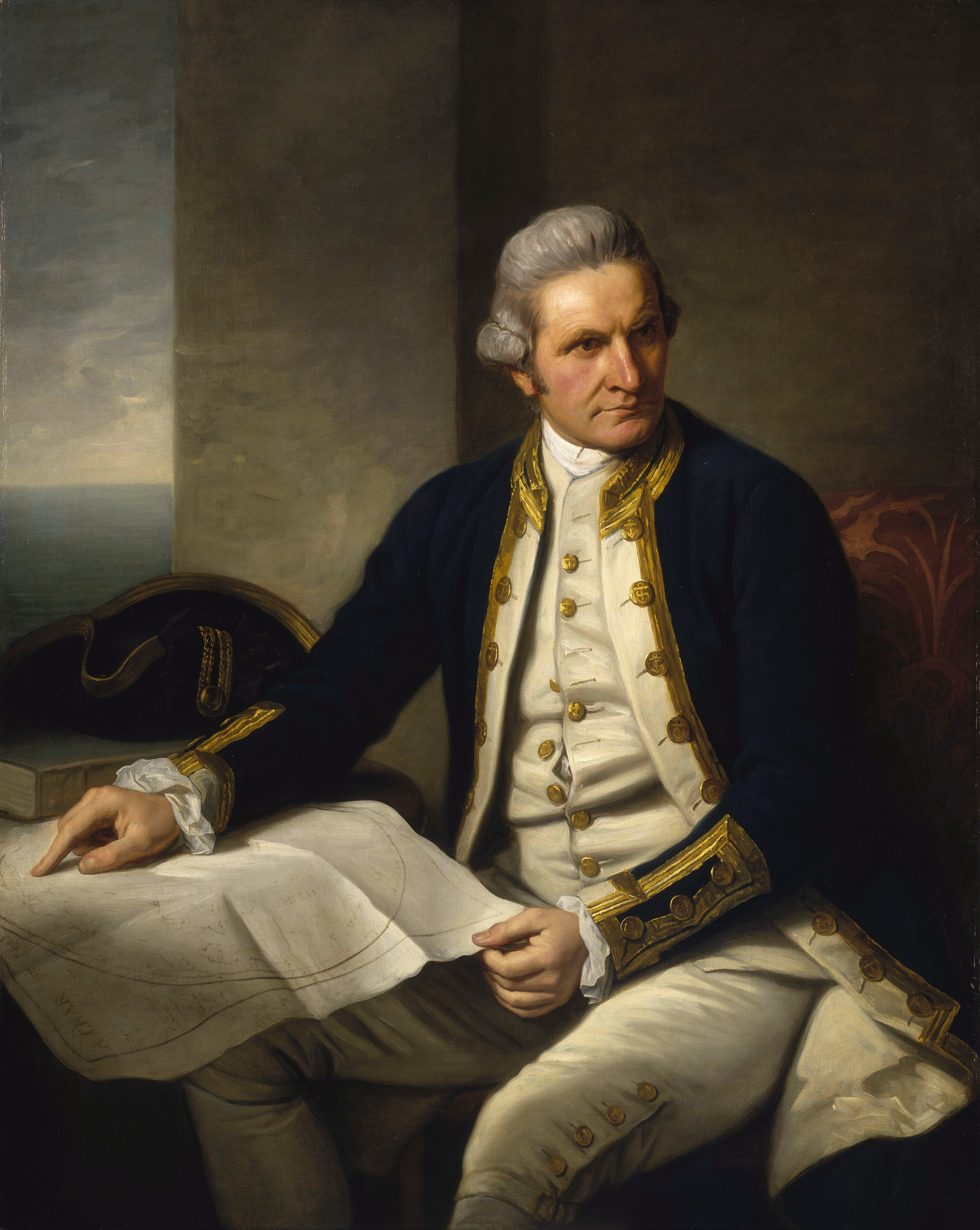
James Cook

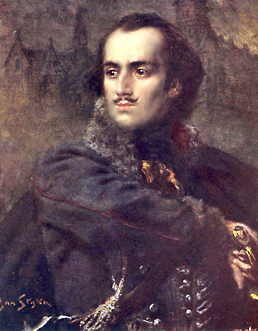
Kazimierz Pułaski

- January 3 – Claude Bourgelat, French veterinary surgeon (b. 1712)
- January 20 – David Garrick, English actor (b. 1717)
- January 22 – Jeremiah Dixon, English surveyor, astronomer (b. 1733)
- February 7 – William Boyce, English composer (b. 1711)
- February 14 – James Cook, British naval captain and explorer (b. 1728)
- February 24 – Paul Daniel Longolius, German encyclopedist (b. 1704)
- April 7 – Martha Ray, British singer and mistress of John Montagu, Earl of Sandwich (murdered) (b. 1742)
- April 9 – Antonio María de Bucareli y Ursúa, Spanish military officer (b. 1717)
- April 24 – Eleazar Wheelock, American founder of Dartmouth College (b. 1711)
- May 1 – Sarah Clayton, English industrialist (b. 1712)
- May 3 – John Winthrop, American astronomer (b. 1714)
- June 7 – William Warburton, English critic, Bishop of Gloucester (b. 1698)
- June 10 – Jane Gomeldon, English writer, poet and adventurer (b. 1720)
- June 16 – Sir Francis Bernard, 1st Baronet, Colonial governor of New Jersey and Massachusetts Bay (b. 1712)
- June 23 – Ras Mikael Sehul, Enderase of Ethiopia (b. 1692)
- June 28 – Martha Daniell Logan, American botanist (b. 1704)
- June 29 – Anton Raphael Mengs, German-Bohemian painter (b. 1728)
- July 21 – Caleb Fleming, English dissenting minister, polemicist (b. 1698)
- August 26 – Henrika Juliana von Liewen, Swedish political salonnière (b. 1709)
- September 12 – Richard Grenville-Temple, 2nd Earl Temple, English politician (b. 1711)
- October 11 – Kazimierz Pułaski, veteran commander of Polish, Russian, and American troops (b. 1745)
- November 16 – Pehr Kalm, Finnish explorer and naturalist (b. 1716)
- December 6 – Jean-Baptiste-Siméon Chardin, French painter (b. 1699)
- December 8 – Nathan Alcock, English physician (b. 1707)
- December 16 – Emperor Go-Momozono of Japan (b. 1758)
- December 17 – Giuseppe Carcani, Italian composer (b. 1703)
- December 23 – Augustus Hervey, 3rd Earl of Bristol, British admiral and politician (b. 1724)

=== unknown date ===
- Giuseppe Bonici, Maltese architect, military engineer (b. 1707)
- Johann Joseph Gassner, German priest (b. 1727)
