= Burial grounds of Sint Eustatius =

Historic sites in the Netherlands Antilles

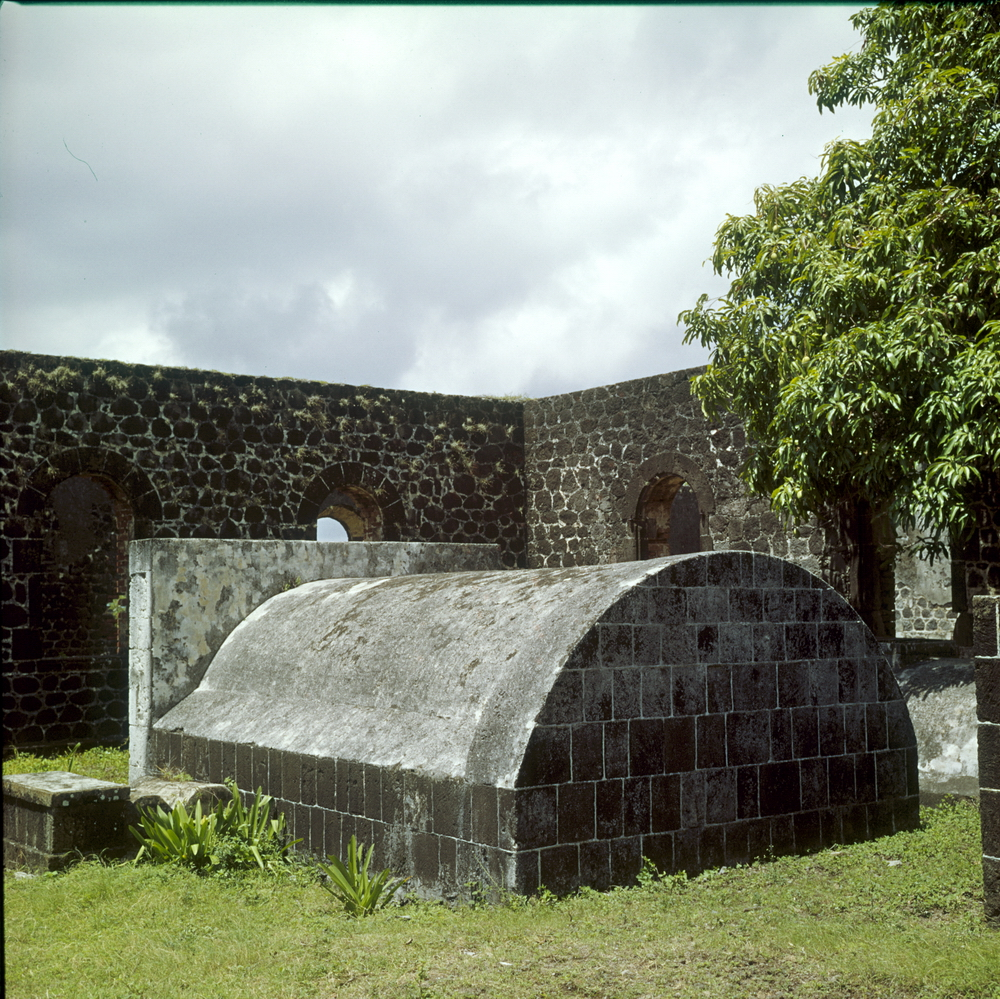
Old graves and ruins of the Dutch Reformed Church dating from 1774

There are 14 known cemeteries on St. Eustatius a special municipality (officially "public body") of the Netherlands, some of which are still in use.

== List of cemeteries ==
- Old Church Cemetery
- Jewish Cemetery
- Anglican Cemetery
- Roman Catholic Cemetery
- Salem Cemetery
- Congo Cemetery
- Benners Family Graveyard
- Berkel Family Graveyard
- de Groebe Family Graveyard
- Cemetery at Schotsenhoek
- Plantation Graveyard at English Quarter
- Plantation Graveyard at Concordia
- Old Dutch Reformed Cemetery
- Lazareto Leper Colony

== Unmarked cemeteries ==
Furthermore, St. Eustatius has several eighteenth-century burial sites of free and enslaved Africans that have been (partially) excavated by archaeologists, such as the slave cemetery of the Godet plantation on the west coast of the island, next to Fort Amsterdam. And the plantation Golden Rock nearby F.D. Roosevelt Airport. In 2021, at least 48 graves of enslaved people were found at the Golden Rock site.

== History ==
The Old Church Cemetery is considered the oldest cemetery in St. Eustatius. The oldest dated headstone in this cemetery is of Lucas Jacobsen, who died on Sept. 17, 1686. Jacobsen was a governor on St. Eustatius from 1671 to 1672. On Salem Cemetery there is a cenotaph for three victims of World War II who were born on St. Eustatius: John Otavo Dembrooke, James Clarence van Putten and William Oraldo Hooker On May 4, during the Remembrance of the Dead, they are remembered with a ceremony at the cemetery.
