= List of protected buildings in Sint Eustatius =

This is a list of protected and unprotected monuments on Sint Eustatius. The monuments are located in the historic center of Oranjestad and beyond.

| Object number | Object name | Location | Address | Cadastre | Coordinates | Image |
|---|---|---|---|---|---|---|
| C01 | Old Church cemetery | on the Eastern edge of Upper Town | Merkmanweg / corner Lodi Road | | | Upload Photo |
| C02 | Jewish cemetery | On the eastern edge of Upper Town | southeast of the intersection of Merkman Weg and Prinses Weg | | | Jewish cemetery More images |
| C04 | Anglican cemetery | In Upper Town, on the corner of Binckesweg/Black Harry Lane, opposite the Methodist Church | Binckesweg | | 17°28′51″N 62°59′04″W | Upload Photo |
| C08 | Roman Catholic Cemetery | On the west side of Van Tonningenweg, between Salem cemetery and Kings Well Resort | Van Tonningenweg | | | Upload Photo |
| F01 | Fort Oranje (at times also known as Old Fort, Fort George, Fort Hollandia) | Beginning of Fort Oranje Straat on the cliff edge in Upper Town, Oranjestad | | RB 8 / 1954 | 17°28′56″N 62°59′11″W | Fort Oranje (at times also known as Old Fort, Fort George, Fort Hollandia) More images |
| F02 | Four Gun Battery (built as Bourbon Battery, also known as Battery Vaughan) | On the cliff edge behind the East end of Salem cemetery | | | | Upload Photo |
| F03 | Waterfort (also: Nieuwe Fort (?), Hollandia (?), Fort/Battery Amsterdam, St. Anna Batterij, Fort Waterloo | At the North end of Lower Town, beyond Smoke Alley, near Godet Plantation | | | | Waterfort (also: Nieuwe Fort (?), Hollandia (?), Fort/Battery Amsterdam, St. Anna Batterij, Fort Waterloo More images |
| F04 | Rotterdam Battery, Nieuwe Fort | Area called Van Zanten's Land | | | | Upload Photo |
| F05 | Battery Royal (also Fort Nassau) | On top of the southwestern extremity of the Horseshoe mountains | | | | Upload Photo |
| F06 | Fort Panga (also: Signal Hill, Seinpost, La Vigie) | On top of the eastern extremity of the Horseshoe mountains | | | | Fort Panga (also: Signal Hill, Seinpost, La Vigie) More images |
| F08 | Tumble Down Dick Battery (also: Tommelendijk, Battery Charlotte) | In the middle of the Oil Terminal port and pipe facilities | | | | Upload Photo |
| F10 | St. Louis Battery (also: Lucie) | On the cliff above Compagnie Bay | | | | Upload Photo |
| F11 | Corre Corre Battery (also: Couroucourou) | On the cliff at the southeastern end of Corre Corre Bay | | | 17°28′49″N 62°56′48″W | Corre Corre Battery (also: Couroucourou) More images |
| F12 | De Windt Battery (also: Fort De Windt, Back-off Battery, Lisburne Battery) | On the cliff at the end of the Road to White Wall | | | 17°27′57″N 62°57′45″W | De Windt Battery (also: Fort De Windt, Back-off Battery, Lisburne Battery) More images |
| F14 | Nassau Battery (also: Fort Nassau) | On the cliff edge at the northern corner of Kay Bay | | | | Upload Photo |
| F15 | Dolijn Battery (also: Batterie La Haye) | On the cliff edge, halfway between the batteries Nassau and Bouille | | | | Upload Photo |
| F17 | Bouillé Battery (also: Battery Citern) | On the cliff edge, on the southern end of the gut leading to Crooks | | | | Upload Photo |
| L01 | | Lower Town, on either side of the northern end of the Bay Road between Smoke Alley and Sampson's Well | Bay Road | | | Upload Photo |
| L02 | | Lower Town, on the sea side of Bay Road between Sampson's Well and warehouse | | | | Upload Photo |
| L03 | | Lower Town, on the cliff side of Bay Road between Sampson's Well and the Bay Path | Bay Road | | | Upload Photo |
| L04 | | Lower Town, on the cliff side of Bay Road between Bay Path and the Old Gin House Hotel | Bay Road | | | Upload Photo |
| L05 | | Lower Town, on either side of the Bay Road between the Old Gin House Hotel/Golden Era Hotel and the drainage gutter just north of the Blue Bead Restaurant | Bay Road | | | Upload Photo |
| L06 | | Lower Town, on the sea side of the Bay Road between the drainage gutter just north of the Blue Bead Restaurant and the small pier | Bay Road | | | Upload Photo |
| L07 | Old Gin House | Lower Town, on the northern 'bank' of Claes Gut. | Bay Road | | 17°28′55″N 62°59′14″W | Old Gin House More images |
| L08 | Customs House, Guard House | In the historic core of Lower Town | Bay Road (in front of the old pier) | | | Upload Photo |
| L09 | | Lower Town, on the Bay Road between the double warehouse (L12) and the seaside terrace of the Old Gin House Hotel | Bay Road | | | Upload Photo |
| L10 | | Lower Town, on the cliff side of the Bay Road, to the immediate right of the Johnson Warehouse | | | | Upload Photo |
| L11 | | In the historic core of Lower Town | Bay Road | | | Upload Photo |
| L12 | Double warehouse | Lower Town, on the sea side of the Bay Road, to the south of the former Customs House. | | | | Upload Photo |
| L13 | Ruin | Lower Town, on the Oranjebaaiweg | | | | Upload Photo |
| L14 | | Lower Town, on the sea side of the Bay Road between the small pier and the Charles A. Woodley Pier | Bay Road | | | Upload Photo |
| L15 | | Lower Town, from Smoke Alley to the Waterfort (Fort Amsterdam) | | | | More images |
| L16 | Smoke Alley | Lower Town, at the very northern end of the Bay Road where it starts to curve upwards | Bay Road | | | Upload Photo |
| L17 | Crooks Castle | Gallows Bay, about one-and-a-half mile south of the large pier | | | | Crooks Castle More images |
| L18 | Old Pier | Lower Town, stretching from the Customs House into the sea | Bay Road | | | Old Pier More images |
| M12 | Wilhelmina Monument | In the historic core of Oranjestad, on the former "Old Market' | Paramiraweg/Damsteeg | | | Wilhelmina Monument More images |
| P01 | Plantation Zeelandia | Country side, area called Zeelandia | | | | Upload Photo |
| P02 | Princess | At the top of Oranjestad, little more than 50 meters from the end of Prinsesweg. | | | | Upload Photo |
| P04 | Calabash Tree Plantation/Concordia Plantation | At the northern end of Concordia Road | Concordia Road | | | Upload Photo |
| P06 | Little Round Hill Hill House | Area called Upper Round Hill | | | | Upload Photo |
| P07 | Sisal Factory | On the cliff side of the beginning of the Road to White Wall | Road to White Wall | | | Sisal Factory More images |
| P08 | Bouillé Plantation | Area called Bouillé | Road to White Wall | | | Bouillé Plantation More images |
| P09 | Schotsenhoek plantation | Area called Schotsenhoek | | RB 8 / 1954 | | Upload Photo |
| P10 | Godet Plantation | The area called Van Zanten's Land or Godet Plantation | Godet | | | Godet Plantation More images |
| P12 | The Mansion | At the top of Oranjestad, in the corner formed by Mansionweg and Lodi Road | Mansionweg | | | The Mansion More images |
| P13 | Glass Bottle Plantation | The area called Glass Bottle | Glass Bottle | | | Upload Photo |
| P14 | Pleasures Plantation | The area called Pleasures | Pleasures | | | Upload Photo |
| P15 | Fair Play plantation and sugar mill | The area called Fair Play | Fair Play | | | Fair Play plantation and sugar mill More images |
| P16 | Tumble Down Dick Plantation/Anna's Lust | Inside Tumble Down Dick Plantation | | | | Upload Photo |
| P17 | English Quarter Plantation | Area called English Quarter | | | | English Quarter Plantation More images |
| R01 | Bay Path (also Old Path, Hill Head) | On the cliff connecting Lower Town with Upper Town | Bay Path | | | Upload Photo |
| R02 | New Path, Nieuwe Pad, Tompy Hill Head | At the end of Kerkweg, leading from the end of Upper Town opposite Rosemarylaan to Lower Town behind Blue Bead Restaurant | New Path | | | Upload Photo |
| U01 | Doncker House, Donckers Nieuwe Tempel | In the historic core of Oranjestad | Wilhelminastraat | RB 8/1951 (RB 7/1951?) | | Doncker House, Donckers Nieuwe Tempel More images |
| U02 | Madam's | In the historic core of Oranjestad | Wilhelminaweg - Fort Oranjestraat | CA 10 / 1978 | | Upload Photo |
| U03 | Deep Yard | In the historic core of Oranjestad | Paramiraweg (3?) | RB 8/1950 | | Deep Yard More images |
| U04 | Het Tuinhuisje | In the historic core of Oranjestad | Rost van Tonningenweg 11 | RB7/1949 | | Upload Photo |
| U05 | Monuments Office | In the historic core of Oranjestad | Rost van Tonningenweg 13 | CA 9/1978 | | Upload Photo |
| U06 | Paper Corner | In the historic core of Oranjestad | Rost van Tonningenweg 15 | CA 9/1978 | | Upload Photo |
| U07 | Berkel's House | In the historic core of Oranjestad | Fort Oranjestraat 1 | C4 /74, C9 /110 | | Upload Photo |
| U08 | Government Guesthouse compound | In the historic core of Oranjestad | Fort Oranjestraat | | | Government Guesthouse compound More images |
| U09 | The Cottage | In historic Oranjestad | Cottageweg | | | Upload Photo |
| U10 | Hill Compound, Three Widows Corner, Old Library) | In the historic core of Oranjestad | Fort Oranjestraat 2-4 | MB 3 / 1964 | | Hill Compound, Three Widows Corner, Old Library) More images |
| U11 | | In the historic core of Oranjestad | Fort Oranjestraat 6 | MB K2 / 1961, E3 150 | | Upload Photo |
| U12 | | In the historic core of Oranjestad | Fort Oranjestraat 8 | RB 8/1949 | | Upload Photo |
| U13 | Gezaghebber's House | In the historic core of Oranjestad | Kerkweg 1 | RB 7/1954 | | Upload Photo |
| U14 | Volk's House | In the historic core of Oranjestad | Kerkweg 4 | C 14/75 | | Upload Photo |
| U15 | Van Putten's House | In the historic core of Oranjestad | Kerkweg 6 | C 19/8 | | Upload Photo |
| U16 | Dutch Reformed Church and Graveyard | In the historic core of Oranjestad | Kerkweg | | 17°28′53″N 62°59′09″W | Dutch Reformed Church and Graveyard More images |
| U17 | (Timmer's House) | In Upper Town, Oranjestad | Kerkweg | | | Upload Photo |
| U18 | (Pompier's House) | In the southern part of Upper Town, Oranjestad | Kerkweg 25 | | | Upload Photo |
| U21 | Wilhelmina Park | In the southern part of Upper Town, Oranjestad | Wilhelmina Park | | 17°28′51″N 62°59′07″W | Upload Photo |
| U22 | Duinkerk's House | In the historic core of Oranjestad | corner Synagogepad/Evertsweg | MB 9/1964 | | Duinkerk's House More images |
| U23 | Mozes' House | In the historic core of Oranjestad | corner Kerkweg/Evertsweg | E2/285 | | Upload Photo |
| U24 | Johnson Compound | in the heart of the historic core of Oranjestad | Fort Oranjestraat (12?), Bredeweg (2?), Synagogepad (5?) | E3 / 30 | | Johnson Compound More images |
| U25 | Synagogue Honen Dalim | In the historic core of Oranjestad | Synagogepad | | 17°28′57″N 62°58′53″W | Synagogue Honen Dalim More images |
| U26 | Evening Rest | In the historic core of Oranjestad with the front façade on Synagoegpad and the back façade on Bredeweg | Synagogepad 9 | E3/30 | | Upload Photo |
| U27 | (Miss Olive Woods' House) | In the historic core of Oranjestad | Bredeweg 4 | E3/52 | | Upload Photo |
| U28 | Mussenden House, also Miss Consie's House or Voges House | In the historic core of Oranjestad | Bredeweg | | | Mussenden House, also Miss Consie's House or Voges House More images |
| U29 | Zeezicht, Catholic club house | In the historic core of Oranjestad, right on the cliff above the Bay Path, on the grounds of the Roman Catholic Church | Van Tonningenweg | RB 10/1950 (C5/15, C6/44, C6/81, C6/86, C6/87, C9/86, C9/87, C9/88, C9/90, C11/88, C11/154) | | Upload Photo |
| U30 | (Ellis' House) | In Upper Town, Oranjestad | Corner Logeweg/Prinsesweg | | 17°28′55″N 62°59′02″W | Upload Photo |
| U32 | Schmidt's House | Upper Town, in the town extension of 1739-1740 | Fort Oranjestraat (East corner Faeschweg) | | 17°28′58″N 62°59′00″W | Upload Photo |
| U33 | Original Fruit Tree Restaurant | In Upper Town, Oranjestad | Prinsesweg 5 | | 17°28′54″N 62°59′02″W | Upload Photo |
| U34 | Doctor's House (also Old Museum) | At the far East end of Upper Town | Prinsesweg 23 | | | Upload Photo |
| U35 | Barber shop | In Upper Town, Oranjestad | Corner Kruisweg/Prinsesweg (nr. 17?) | | | Barber shop More images |
| U37 | (Stella Hassel's house) | In Upper Town, Oranjestad | Kapelweg (on the lower end of the south side) | | | Upload Photo |
| U38 | Old Public School | In southern part of Upper Town, Oranjestad | Bredeweg between Binckesweg and Vannesweg | | | Upload Photo |
| U39 | China House | In southern part of Upper Town, Oranjestad | Northeast corner Vannesweg/E.C. Flander Road | | | Upload Photo |
| U40 | Old Allruns | In the southern part of Upper Town, Oranjestad | Flander Road (21?) | | | Upload Photo |
| U41 | Pandt's House | In historic Upper Town, Oranjestad | Prinsesweg, south side, between Black Harry Lane and Kruisweg | | | Upload Photo |
| U42 | (Miss Busby's storage house, also Miss Louise's house) | In the historic core of Oranjestad | Prinsesweg (1?) | RB 4/1948; E3/27 | | Upload Photo |
| U43 | Miss Busby's House | In the historic core of Oranjestad | Prinsesweg 3 | E4/94 | | Upload Photo |
| U44 | Cassidor's House | In the historic core of Oranjestad | Kerkweg 2 | RB 3/1947 | | Upload Photo |
| U45 | | In the historic core of Oranjestad | corner Bredeweg/Evertsweg | | | Upload Photo |
| U46 | | In the historic core of Oranjestad | Synagogepad 11 | | | Upload Photo |
| U47 | Van Zanten's grocery | In the historic core of Oranjestad | Kerkweg | RB9/1950; E3/97 | | Upload Photo |
| U48 | Hillman's House | In the center of Upper Town, Oranjestad | Fort Oranjestraat/corner Logeweg | | 17°28′57″N 62°59′03″W | Upload Photo |
| U50 | Lutheran church ruins | In the southern extension of historic Upper Town, Oranjestad | Vannesweg, on the plot of land between E.C. Flander Road and Black Harry Lane | | | Upload Photo |
| U52 | Roman Catholic Church of St. Eustatius | In the historic core of Oranjestad, on the "Old Market,' at the top of the Bay Path | Paramiraweg | RB 10/1950 (C5/15, C6/44, C6/81, C6/86, C6/87, C9/85, C9/86, C9/87, C9/88, C9/90, C11/88, C11/154) | 17°28′59″N 62°59′12″W | Roman Catholic Church of St. Eustatius More images |
| U53 | Glover's House | In the historic core of Oranjestad | Paramiraweg 1 | CA 9/1978 | | Upload Photo |
| U54 | | Cliff edge of Upper Town Oranjestad, between extension of Sandy Road, the cliff, the Kingswell Resort and Salem Public Cemetery | Van Tonningenweg? | | | Upload Photo |
| U55 | Cool Corner | In the historic core of Oranjestad | Emmaweg | RB 7/1947 | | Cool Corner More images |
| U56 | | In the historic core of Oranjestad | Fort Oranjestraat 3 | C19/8 | | Upload Photo |
| U57 | (The nursery) | In the center of historic Upper Town | Breedeweg/ south corner Prinsesweg | | 17°28′54″N 62°59′06″W | Upload Photo |
| U58 | (Park Place) | In the historic core of Oranjestad | MB K3/1961; C15/14 | C 8/97 | | (Park Place) More images |
| U59 | Sprott's House | In the historic core of Oranjestad | Wilhelminaweg 1 | C 8/97 | | Sprott's House More images |
| U60 | Old Market | In the center of Upper Town, Oranjestad, at the end of the Bay Path | Paramiraweg/Damsteeg | | | Upload Photo |
| U63 | Bethel Methodist Church | In Upper Town, Oranjestad | Corner Black Harry Lane and Kapelweg | | 17°28′52″N 62°59′02″W | Bethel Methodist Church |
| U67 | | In historic Oranjestad | Paramiraweg (5?) | E2/298 | | Upload Photo |
| U68 | Old Catholic School + Hole in the Wall | In the historic core of Oranjestad, right on the cliff above the Bay Path | Van Tonningenweg | RB 10/1950 (C5/15, C6/44, C6/81, C6/86, C6/87, C9/85, C9/86, C9/87, C9/88, C9/90, C11/88, C11/154) | | Upload Photo |
| U69 | | In the historic core of Oranjestad | Emmaweg, at the back of Cool Corner | C6/1 | | Upload Photo |
| U70 | (Green and White Cove) | In the historic core of Oranjestad | Fort Oranjestraat 10 | RB 4/1956; E2/272 | | (Green and White Cove) |
| U71 | | In the historic core of Oranjestad | Wilhelminaweg 3 | | | Upload Photo |
| U72 | | In the historic core of Oranjestad | Kerkweg, behind the Sand Box Bakery on the left, on the same plot | RB 11/1949 | | Upload Photo |
| U73 | | In the beginning of the eastern Upper Town extension of 1739/1740, adjacent to the Methodist church yard on Kapelweg | Kapelweg | | | Upload Photo |
| U74 | DP building | In the center of Upper Town, Oranjestad | Fort Oranjestraat | | | Upload Photo |
| U75 | | In eastern part of Upper Town, Oranjestad | Fort Oranjestraat | | | Upload Photo |
| U76 | Madam Theatre | In historic centre of Oranjestad | Fort Oranjestraat 11 | E-7/124 | | Madam Theatre More images |
| W01 | Taylor's Well | in the 1739-1740 extension of Upper Town | On the West side of Black Harry Lane, near the junction with Binkesweg | | | Upload Photo |
| W02 | Samson's Well (also Sampson's Well) | On the cliff side of the Bay Road, towards its northern end | Bay Road | | | Upload Photo |
| W04 | King's Well | Within the curve of the northern end of Bay Road | Bay Road | | 17°29′09″N 62°59′28″W | Upload Photo |
