= GVP =

GVP may refer to:

== Places ==
- Greenvale Airport, Australia, by IATA code

== Organisations ==
- All-German People's Party (German: Gesamtdeutsche Volkspartei), a political party in West Germany
- Goa Vikas Party, a political party in Goa, India
- Great Valley Products, a former third-party Amiga hardware supplier
- Gwendoline van Putten School, a secondary school in St. Eustatius, Dutch Caribbean
- Golden Village Pictures, the distribution arm of cinema operator Golden Village

== Other ==
- Global Volcanism Program, of the Smithsonian Institution
- Good Pharmacovigilance Practice as defined by the European Medicines Agency (EMA)
- Pará Gavião language, by ISO 639 code
