= African sites =

African sites may refer to:

- African Sites: Archaeology in the Caribbean
- List of World Heritage Sites in Africa
- African-American Heritage Sites
