= Golden Rock African Burial Ground =

Burial ground in the Dutch Caribbean

Coordinates: 17°29′30.54″N 62°58′58.66″W

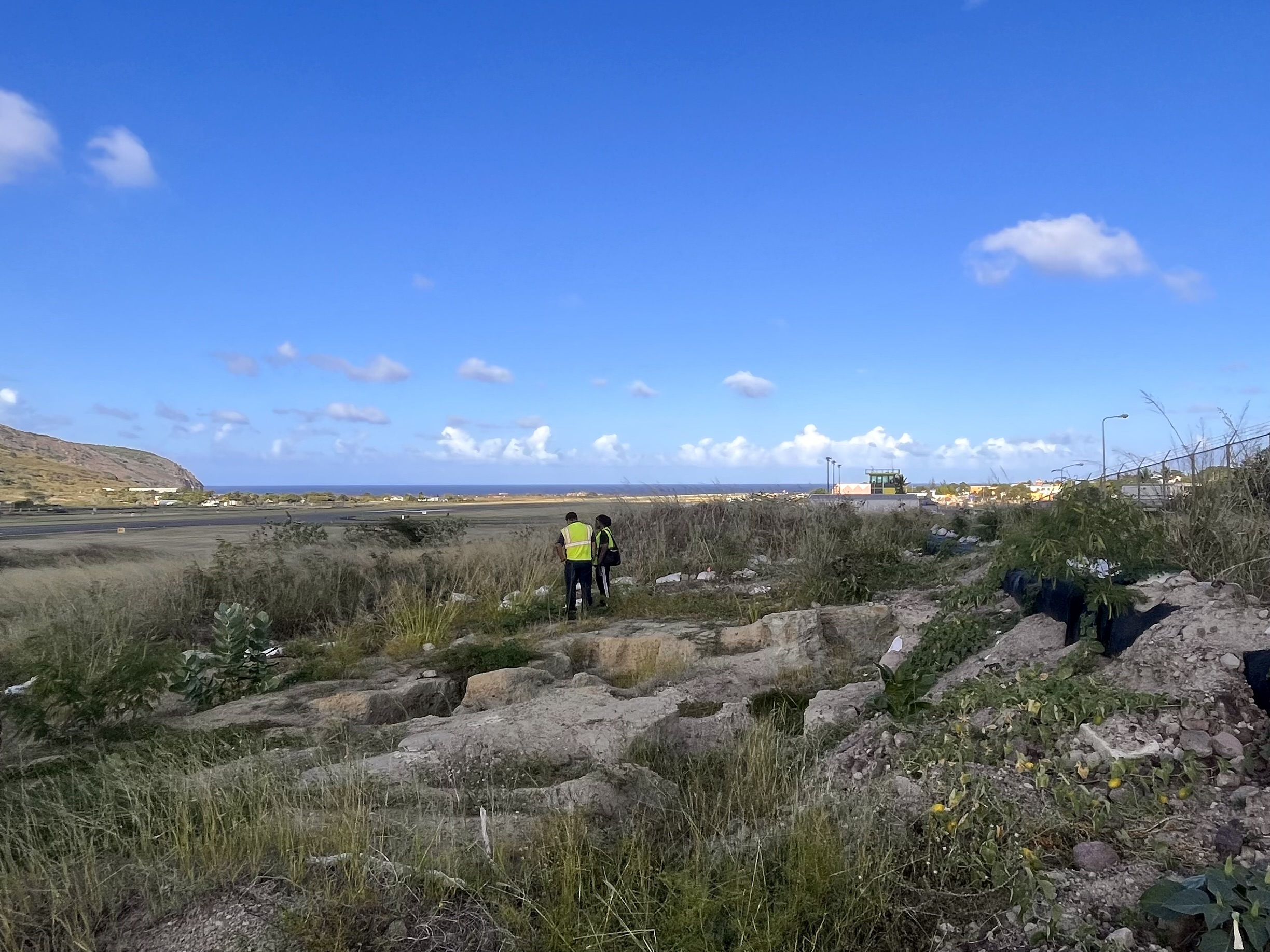
Excavation site Golden Rock Burial Ground Sint Eustatius

The Golden Rock African Burial Ground is an unmarked historical burial ground of enslaved African men, women and children located on the premises of the airport on Sint Eustatius, Dutch Caribbean in the ‘Cultuurvlakte’. The burial ground was part of the former Golden Rock plantation on the island.

== History ==
Sint Eustatius was an important transit port in the trans-Atlantic slave trade due to its strategic location, deep harbor and system of free trade. The small island played a significant role in the transshipment of captured Africans to the British, French, and Spanish islands of the eastern Caribbean. There was no large plantation economy, but in the eighteenth century there were as many as 75 plantations on the island. The Golden Rock Plantation was one of the largest plantations of Sint Eustatius centrally located in between two elevated areas, Signal Hill and Little Mountain to the northwest and a dormant volcano, the Quill to the southeast. The name Golden Rock is derived from the nickname of the rocky island in the period of the eighteenth century when prosperity was very great.

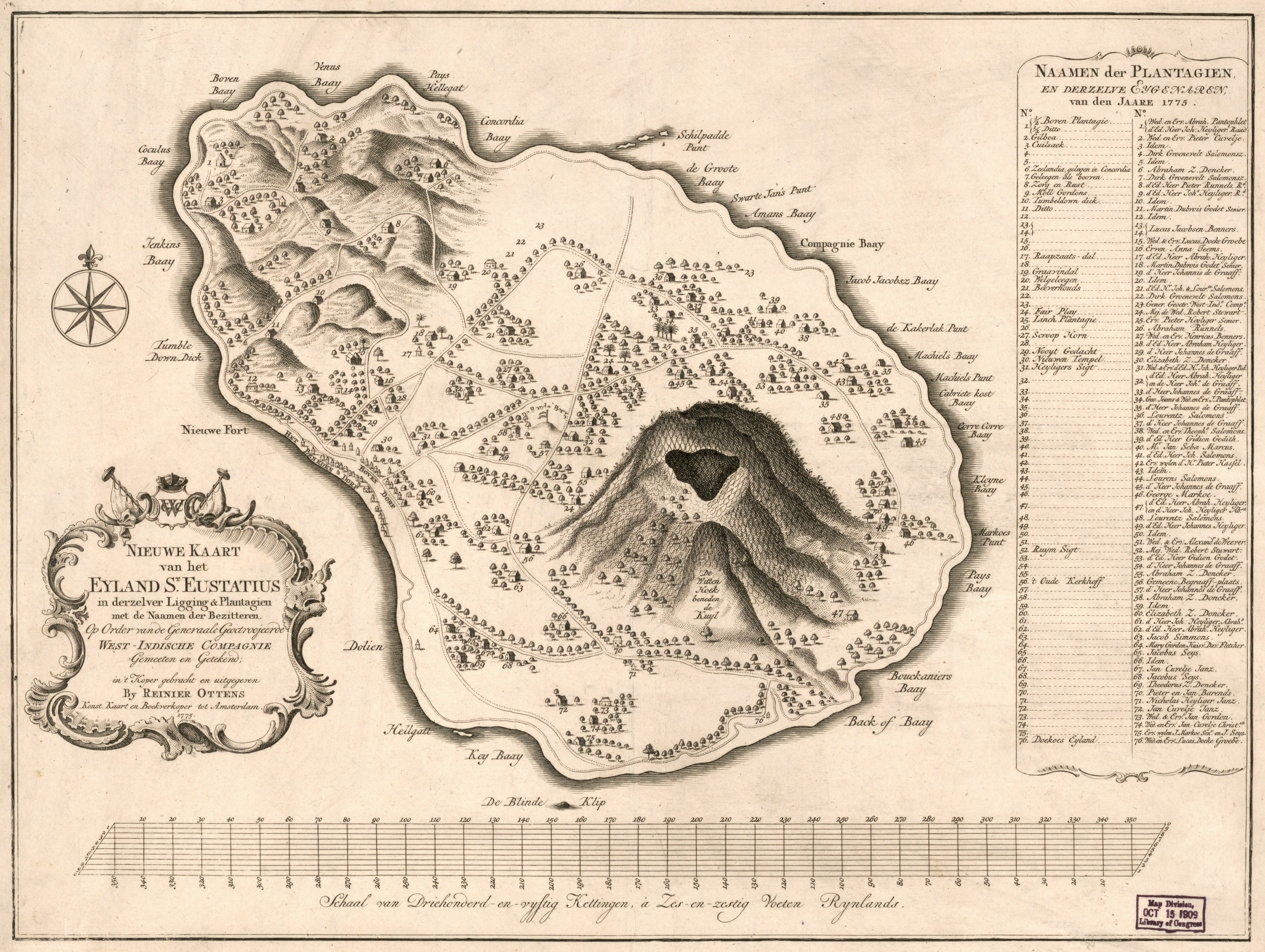
Topographic map of Sint Eustatius with location and plantations with the names of the owners, measured and signed by order of the Dutch West India Company. R. Ottens 1775 (Library of Congress LOC 74691604)

== Archaeological excavations ==
Archaeological investigations were carried out at the Golden Rock site in 1923 by J.P.B. Josselin de Jong, J.B. Haviser in 1981, and between 1984-1989 by A.H. Versteeg, K. Schinkel and others. In June 2021, the news that an international team of archaeologists had begun excavations at possibly one of the largest slave burial sites in the Caribbean spread around the world.

== Controversies ==
Not long after the start of the excavations in 2021, protests arose from the inhabitants of Sint Eustatius. Several groups called attention to the way the excavations had been carried out and the lack of involvement of the local population, mostly of African descent. The government of Sint Eustatius halted the excavations in July 2021 and set up a commission of inquiry, the Statia Heritage and Implementation Commission (SHRC). This commission published a report with recommendations in January 2022. In October 2022, the Statia Cultural Heritage and Implementation Committee was set up to implement those recommendations.

== Commemoration ==
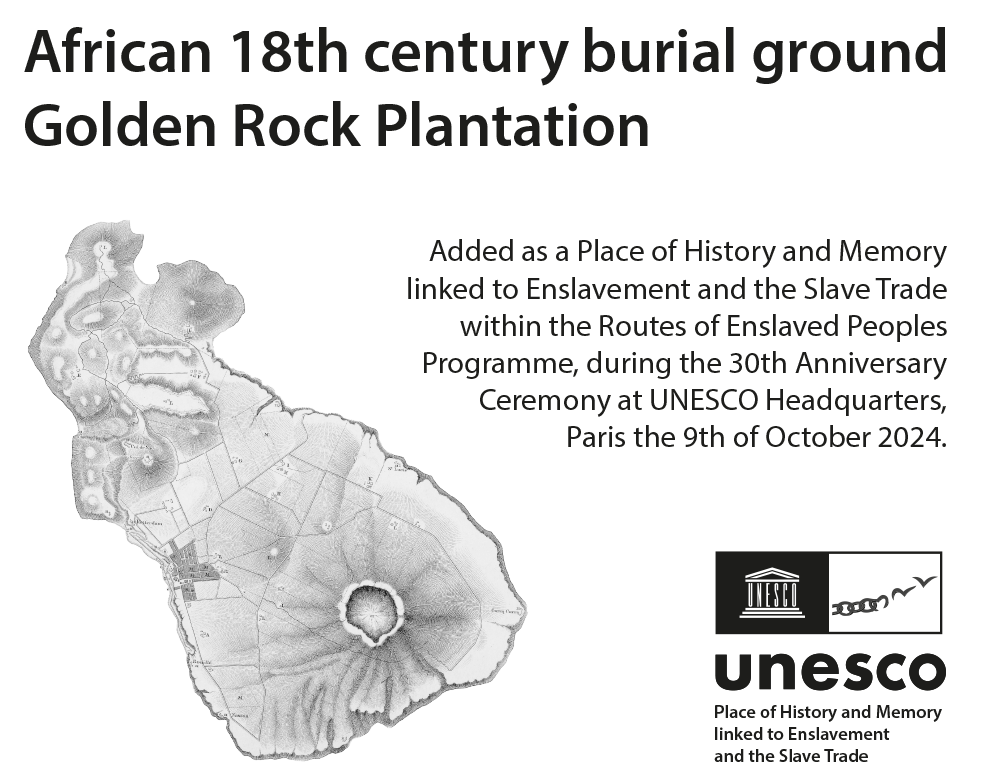
The Unesco Golden Rock plaque for the African 18th century burial ground of the Golden Rock Plantation as part of the Routes of Enslaved Peoples Programme under which the burial ground was recognized as a Place of history and memory linked to enslavement and the slave trade

The Golden Rock African Burial Ground is of historical importance to the people of Sint Eustatius. The reputation of former plantation owners is still part of the oral history of the island. Protests by the inhabitants of Sint Eustatius against the controversial excavations led to increased awareness and attention for the African cultural heritage on the island. UNESCO Netherlands Committee applied for the label “Routes of Enslaved Peoples” for the Golden Rock African Burial Ground as well as the Godet African Burial Ground in November 2022. In response to the controversial excavations, residents of the island have started research into their own slavery past, including making an inventory from historical archive sources of the inhabitants of African descent from the Golden Rock plantation just before the abolition of slavery in 1863. On October 9, 2024, the two historical cemeteries were inscribed as part of “UNESCO's Network of Places of History and Memory linked to Enslavement and the Slave Trade” during the 30th anniversary celebration of the “Routes of Enslaved Peoples” programme.
