= Makana Ferry Service =

Ferry serving Dutch Caribbean islands and Saint Kitts and Nevis

Makana is an international ferry that provides daily or near-daily service between Sint Maarten, Saba, Sint Eustatius in the Dutch Caribbean as well as Basseterre on Saint Kitts.

The M/V Makana is a 72-inch Sabre catamaran fast ferry with a capacity of 150 passengers. The boat has a central lower patio as well as an upper deck which has a covered area for business class passengers as well as a sundeck. The ferry is air-conditioned with a bar service area and two toilets. It launched service in 2022.

It increased fares in May, 2024, as the operation no longer received a subsidy. That same summer the ferry increased service frequency.
