= St. Eustatius Church (Oranjestad) =

- Sint Eustatius Kerk
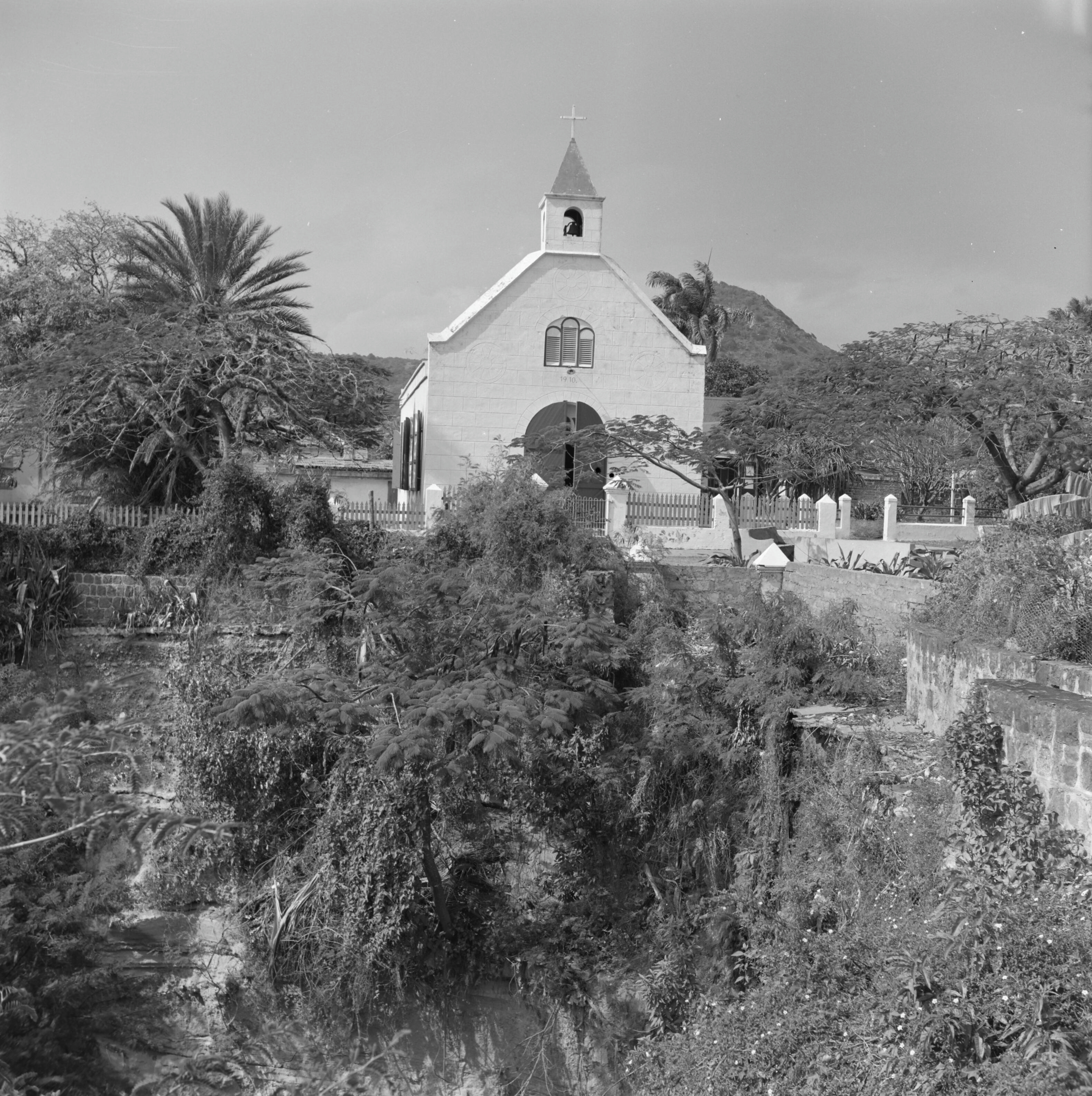
- St. Eustatius Church
- 17°28′59″N 62°59′12″W
- Location: Oranjestad; Sint Eustatius
- Country: Netherlands
- Denomination: Roman Catholic Church

St. Eustatius Church (Dutch: Sint Eustatius Kerk) is a parish of the Catholic Church in Oranjestad, Sint Eustatius, the capital of the Caribbean island of St. Eustatius, in the Dutch Caribbean.

It is part of the Catholic Diocese of Willemstad (Dioecesis Gulielmopolitana), based on the island of Curacao. It is very close to two island attractions Fort Oranje and St. Eustatius Historical Museum.

== See also ==
- Catholic Church in the Dutch Caribbean
