= Gwendoline van Putten School =

Location
- Fiscal z/n, St. Eustatius; St. Eustatius
- Coordinates: 17.4843819°N 62.987457800000016°W

Information
- Type: Secondary school
- Website: www.gvpschool.com

Gwendoline van Putten School (GvP) is the sole secondary and vocational school in St. Eustatius. It offers the PRO stream from the Dutch system and the secondary school qualifications offered by the Caribbean Examinations Council.
