= Greenvale Airport =

- IATA: GVP; ICAO: YGNV

Summary
- Location: Greenvale, Queensland, Australia
- Coordinates: 18.995°S 145.012°E

Map

Greenvale Airport (IATA: GVP, ICAO YGNV) is an airport in Greenvale, Queensland, Australia. The entrance to the airport is on the Gregory Highway, about 2 miles east of Greenvale.
