= Plantations of Sint Eustatius =

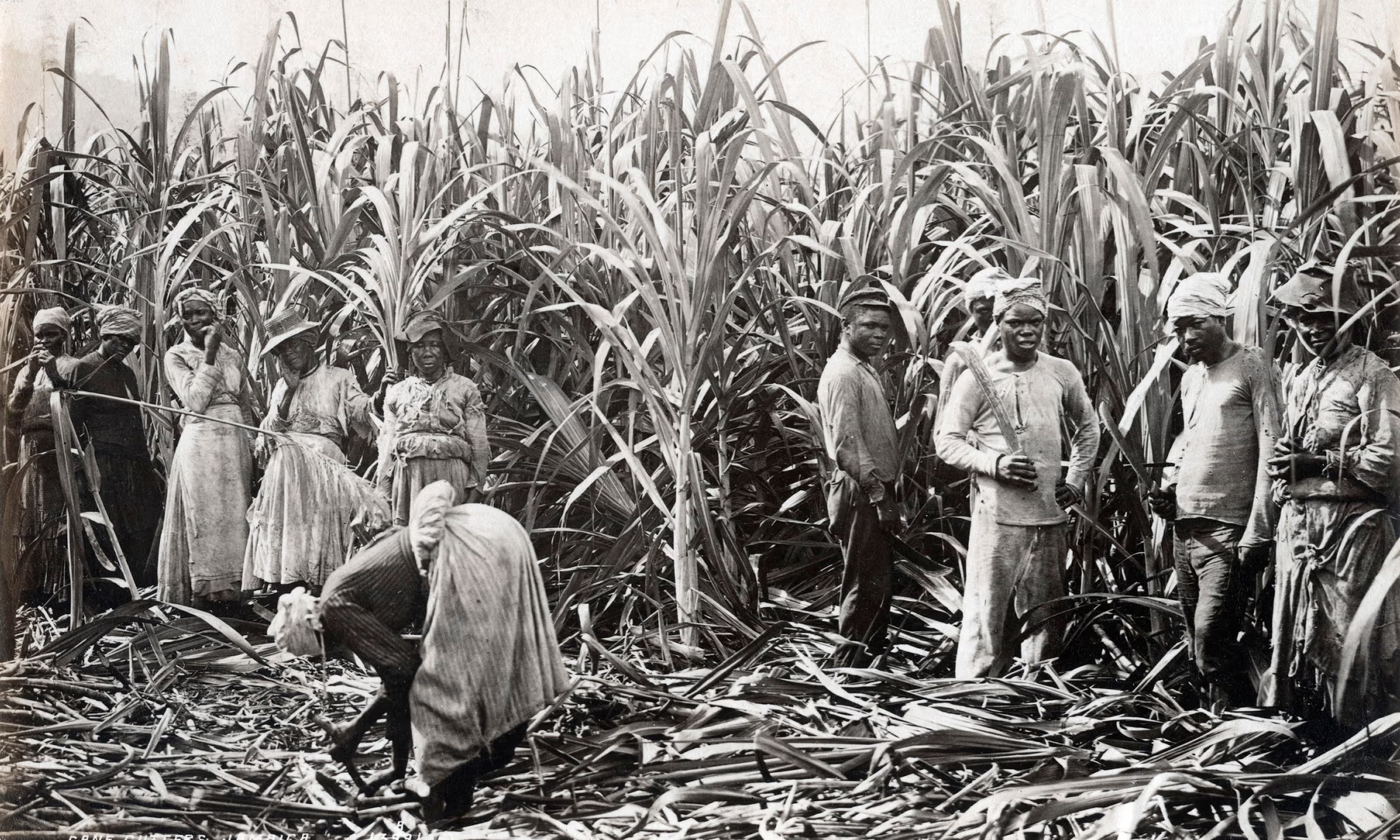
Cane cutters in Jamaica (1879-1891)

The plantations of Sint Eustatius (Dutch Caribbean) were primarily set up in the seventeenth and eighteenth centuries by European settlers. Workers on the plantations were obtained from human trafficking, and the proceeds primarily went back to the mother country. In the second half of the eighteenth century, trade became more of a priority to Sint Eustatius rather than the plantation economy.

== History ==
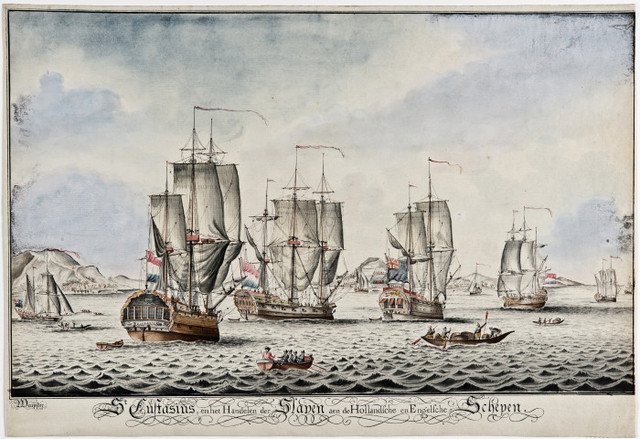
St. Eustatius und and the slave trade on dutch and english ships

The colonization of Sint Eustatius began in 1635 by Jan Snouck and other Zeelanders. In 1682, the island was sold to the Dutch West India Company (WIC), which owned it until its abolition in 1792. The patronage was in the hands of a group of merchants from Zeeland, the Netherlands, including Abraham van Peere and Pieter van Rhee. The first tobacco of Sint Eustatius was introduced on the market in Vlissingen in 1638. Around 1689, many plantation owners moved away due to repeated destruction and looting during takeovers by other colonial powers, often to nearby Saint Thomas. The plantations were neglected. The Peace of Utrecht introduced a truce and in 1715, eleven sugar plantations were operating again. The neglected plantations, owned by the West India Company, were sold around 1730. In the 1740s, trade on Sint Eustatius progressed and the 'Benedendorp' (Lower village) of Sint Eustatius was built up, including many warehouses.

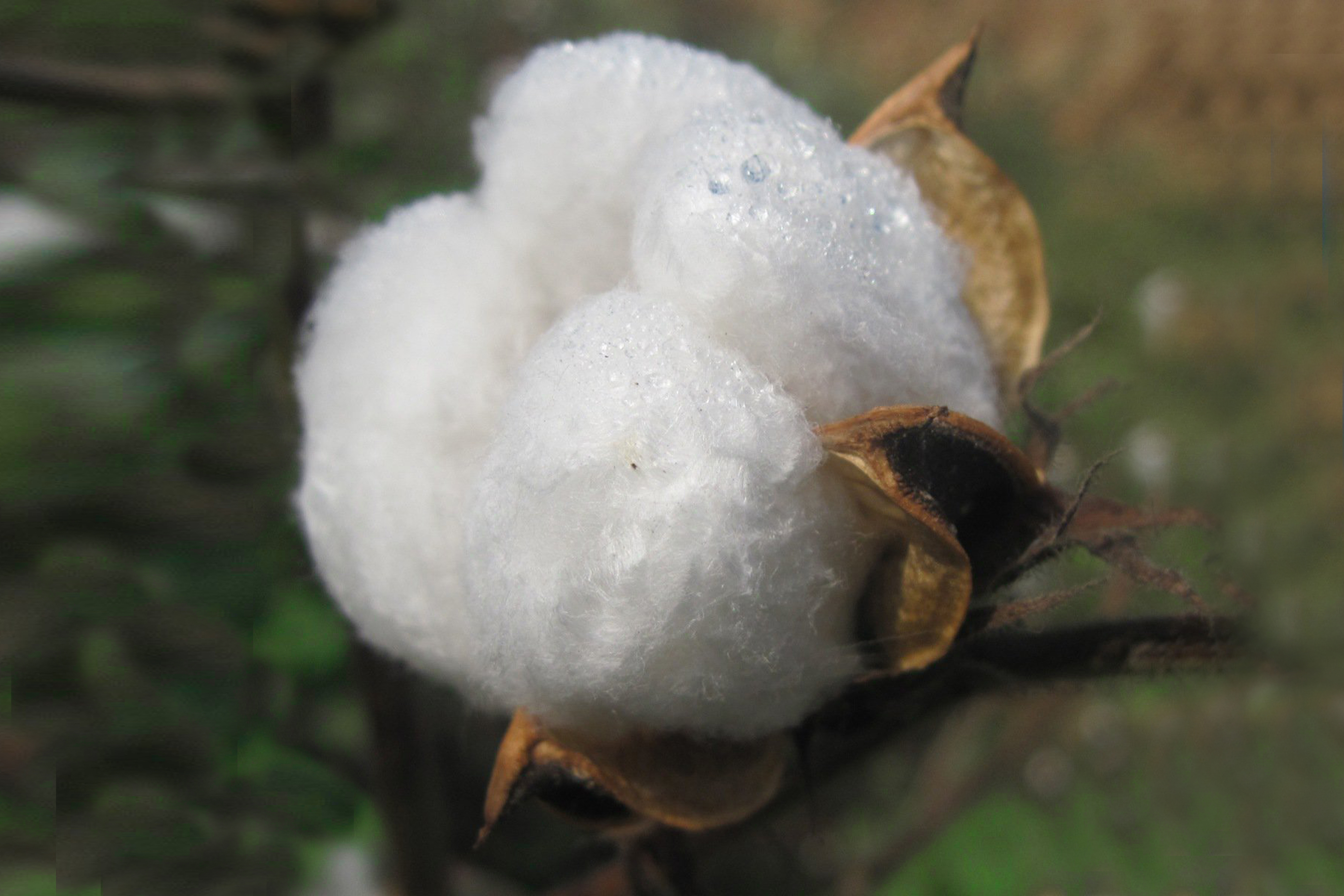
Balls of cotton ready for harvest

The number of plantations increased from 35 in the 1730s to 75 in the 1750s. In 1840, there were ten left. In 1752, wealthy planters moved to the Dutch colony of Demerara, which then began to flourish. The first plantations introduced were tobacco plantations, which in later decades gave pathway to coffee, cotton, and sugarcane plantations. Cotton farming continued until about 1740. The Great Hurricane of 1780 destroyed the coffee plantations on Sint Eustatius and coffee cultivation has since disappeared. After the Capture of Sint Eustatius by Admiral George Rodney in 1781 and the subsequent French occupation, Sint Eustatius returned to Dutch hands in 1784. Many inhabitants who had fled to Saint Thomas returned and agriculture was again practiced on a large scale. This was primarily the sugarcane culture. At the beginning of the twentieth century, then Lieutenant Governor Gerrit Johan van Grol (1867-1950) made several attempts to make cotton cultivation and honey cultivation abundant on the island.

== Size and location ==
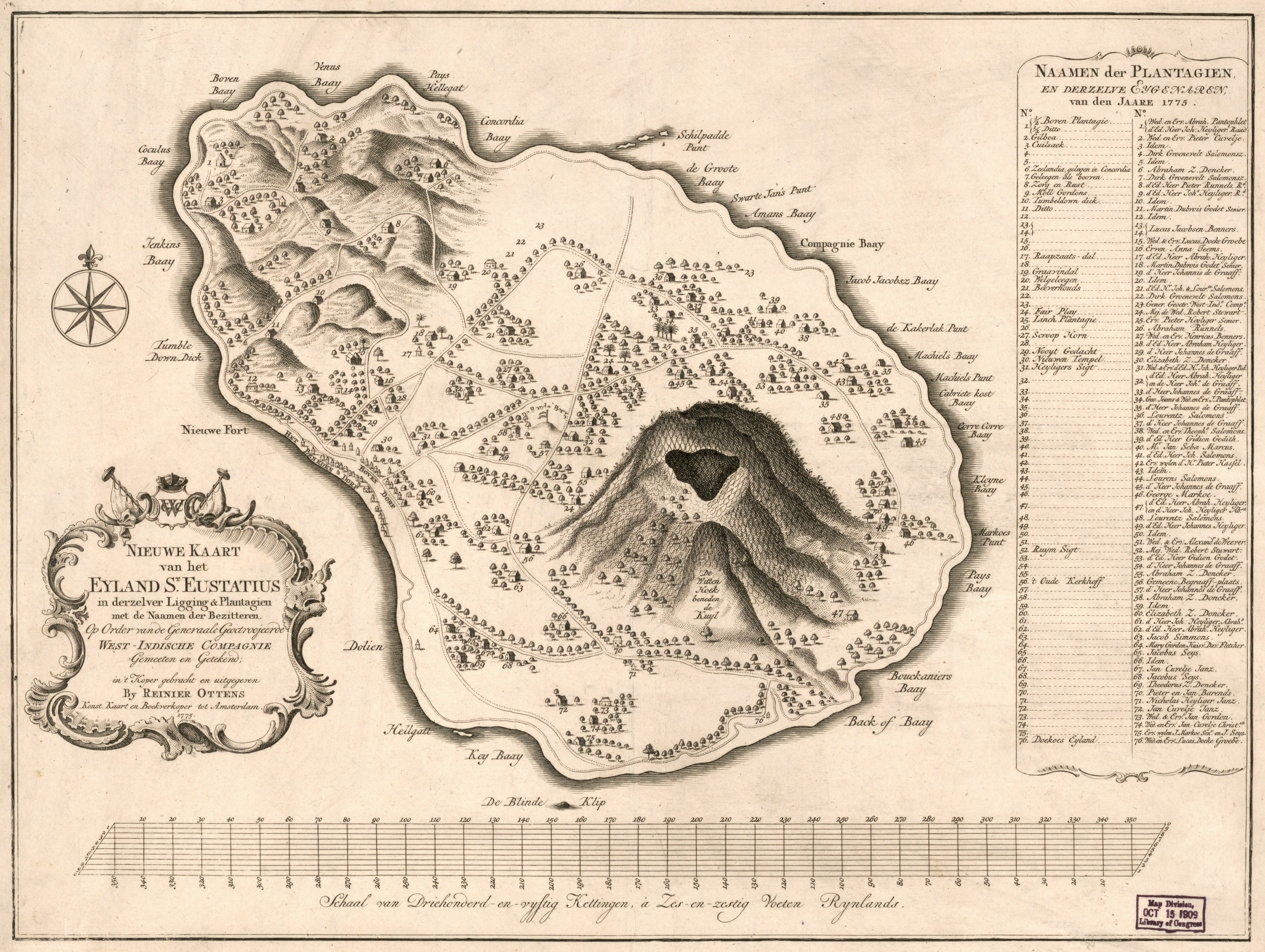
Map of Sint Eustatius with the location of the plantations and the names of the owners. Reinier Ottens, 1775

Sint Eustatius did not develop into a full plantation economy as in Suriname, for example, due to the low annual rainfall. Long periods of drought resulted in crop failures. Deforestation and erosion led to poor soil quality.

Much archival material, from Sint Eustatius from the seventeenth and eighteenth century, has been lost due to hurricanes and violent takeovers by the French and English. From historical maps of Sint Eustatius, information can be derived about the names of the plantations, the division of ownership, and the size of possessions. These maps are still used by historians and archaeologists.

Archaeological excavations also contribute to knowledge about the plantations. Because relatively few large-scale economic development projects have taken place on St. Eustatius, the island is rich in archaeological sites. Excavations have taken place on former plantations Golden Rock, Godet, Guyeau, Fair Play, Schottenhoek, Steward and Pleasures and are mostly performed by the St. Eustatius Center for Archaeological Research (SECAR).

== Slavery ==
The first settlers used kidnapped indigenous peoples as slave laborers, also called "red" slaves, primarily from Dominica. The first enslaved Africans of the transatlantic slave trade were brought to Sint Eustatius in the 1640s, and then worked on the increasingly successful tobacco plantations. By 1650 they had completely replaced the indigenous slave laborers.

== Plantation owners ==
Many of the elite of Sint Eustatius were both planters and traders. The families Heyliger, Doncker, De Windt, Lindesay, Markoe and Cuviljé formed a close-knit oligarchy. Abraham Heyliger and William Moore were among the richest settlers with an abundance of land and the most numbers of enslaved workers owned.

== List of plantations ==
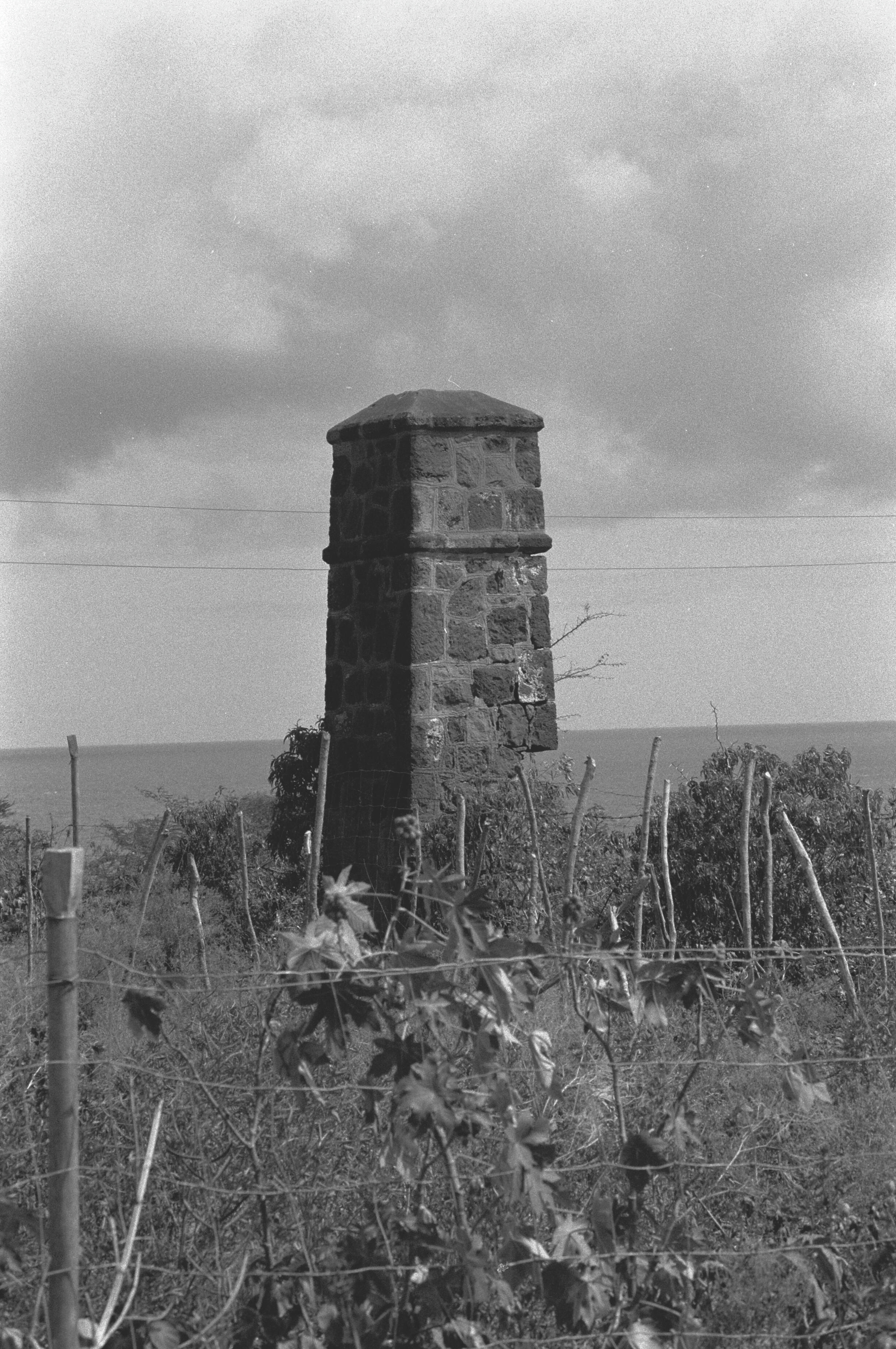
Remnants of sugar plantation English Quarter, chimney - 20652577 - Cultural Heritage Agency Netherlands

The list below provides an overview of the plantations that existed on Sint Eustatius.

- Benners
- English Quarter
- Fair Play
- Planation Concordia
- Cherry Tree
- Gilboa
- Godet
- Golden Rock
- Guyeau
- Heyligers Sigt
- Kuilzak
- De Loovers
- Lynch Plantation
- Mussendena
- Nooit Gedacht
- Pleasures
- Princess
- Ruym Sigt
- Schotsenhoek
- Steward
- Testemakers
- Witten Hoek
- Zeelandia
- Zorg en Rust

== Burial grounds ==
Over the years, unmarked burial grounds have been discovered in various former plantations on Sint Eustatius, where human remains have also been excavated. This concerned cemeteries from the time of Saladoid habitation as well as African burial ground belonging to a former plantation such as the Godet African Burial Ground and the Golden Rock African Burial Ground.

== Meaning in the present time ==
The current landscape of Sint Eustatius is still primarily determined by the location of the old plantations. Ruins of the plantation houses can be found everywhere. Many roads follow the boundaries of the old plantations and districts or regions on the island often have the same names.
