= Sint Eustatius =

Dutch Caribbean island

- Special municipality of the Netherlands
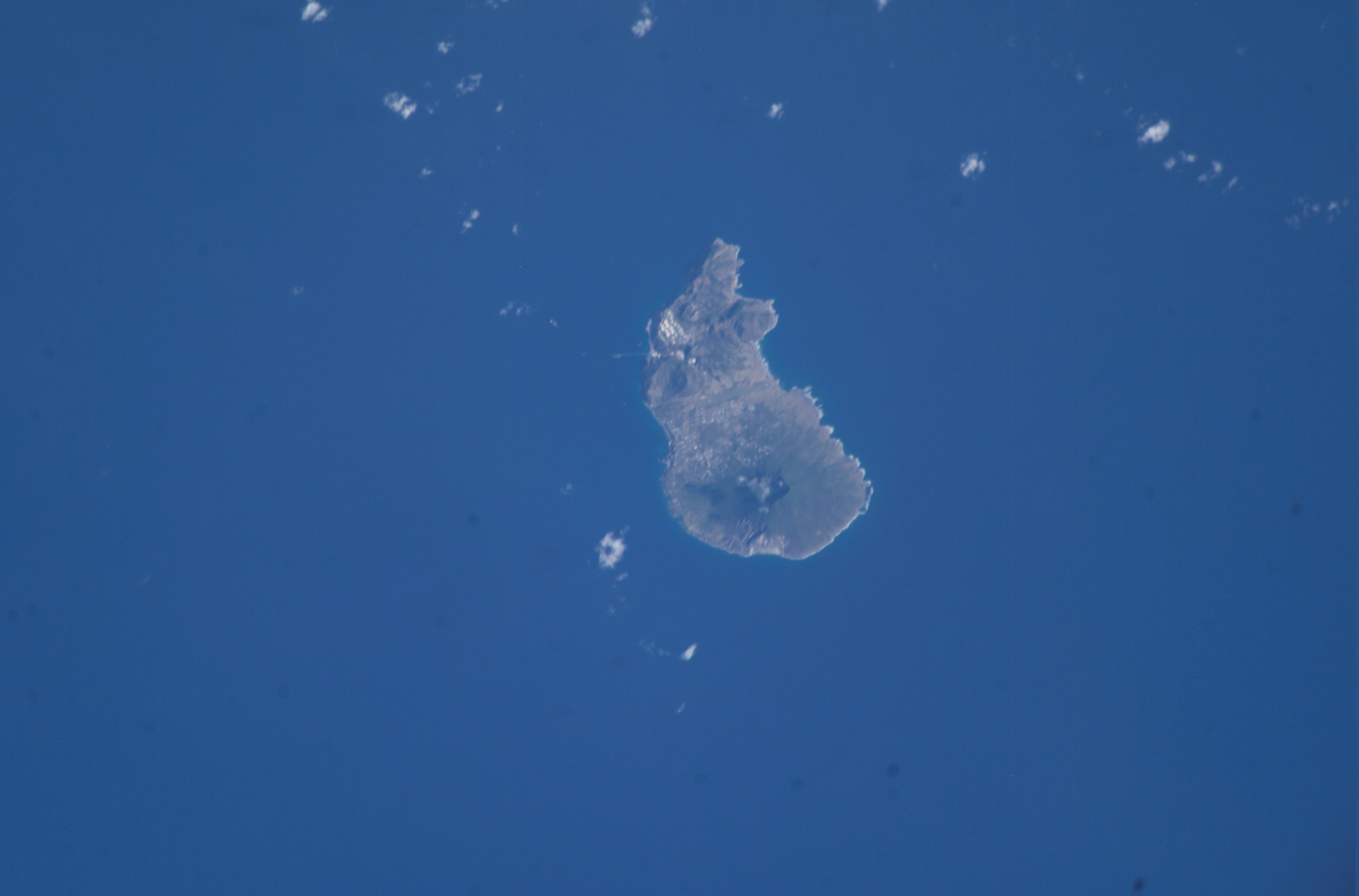
- Satellite image of Sint Eustatius

- Flag Coat of arms
- Motto: Superba et confidens (Latin) "Proud and confident" (English)
- Anthem: "Golden Rock"
- Location of Sint Eustatius (circled in red) in the Caribbean

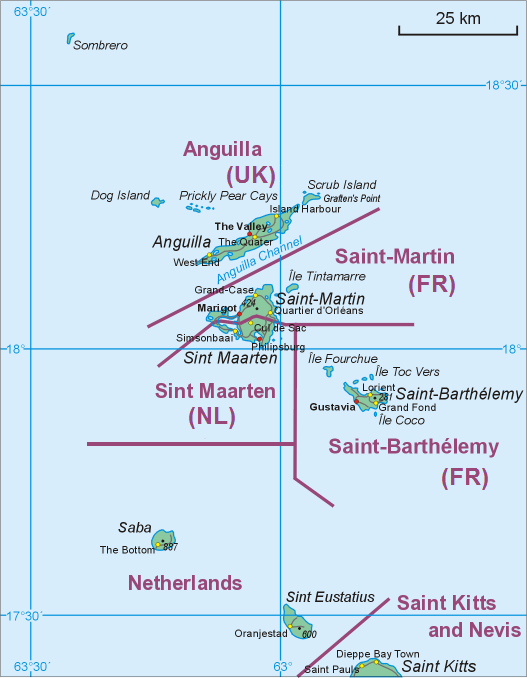
- Map showing the location of St. Eustatius relative to Saba and St. Martin
- Coordinates: 17°28′57″N 62°59′9″W
- Country: Netherlands
- Overseas region: Caribbean Netherlands
- Incorporated into the Netherlands: 10 October 2010 (dissolution of the Netherlands Antilles)
- Municipal seat: Oranjestad

Government (see Politics of the Netherlands)
  - Lt. Governor: Alida Francis (Government commissioner)

Area
  - Total: 21 km^{2} (8.1 sq mi)

Population (1 January 2025)
  - Total: 3,270
  - Density: 154/km^{2} (400/sq mi)
- Demonyms: St. Eustatian; Statian; Dutch

Languages
  - Official: English (Note: English can be used in relations with the government.) • Dutch
- Time zone: UTC−4 (AST)
- Calling code: +599
- ISO 3166 code: BQ-SE, NL-BQ3
- Currency: United States dollar ($) (USD)
- Internet TLD: .nl; .bq (Note: .bq is designated, but not in use, for the Caribbean Netherlands. Like the rest of the Netherlands, .nl is primarily in use.)

Sint Eustatius, (Note: /juːˈsteɪʃəs/ yoo-STAY-shəs, Dutch: [sɪnt øːˈstaː(t)sijʏs]) known locally as Statia, (Note: /ˈsteɪʃə/ STAY-shə) is an island in the Caribbean. It is a special municipality (officially "public body") of the Netherlands.

The island is in the northern Leeward Islands, southeast of the Virgin Islands. Sint Eustatius is immediately to the northwest of Saint Kitts and southeast of Saba. The regional capital is Oranjestad. The island has an area of 21 square kilometres (8.1 sq mi). Travelers to the island by air arrive through F. D. Roosevelt Airport.

Formerly part of the Netherlands Antilles, Sint Eustatius became a public body of the Netherlands in 2010. It is part of the Dutch Caribbean, which consists of Aruba, Bonaire, Curaçao, Saba, Sint Eustatius, and Sint Maarten. Together with Bonaire and Saba, it forms the BES Islands, also referred to as the Caribbean Netherlands.

Sint Eustatius played a major role in the American War for Independence, supplying American insurgents with war material, especially gunpowder. The British captured St. Eustatius, which was a major blow to the U.S. and its European allies. The French navy later in the war recaptured the island.

== Etymology ==
The island's name, Sint Eustatius, is Dutch for Saint Eustace, a legendary Christian martyr. The saint's name is also rendered as Eustathius (from Greek Εὐστάθιος, Eustathios) or Eustachius (from Greek Εὐστάχιος, Eustachios). Although these Greek names originally had different meanings, their Latin forms became conflated in medieval usage. The name should not be confused with Eustratios (Greek: Εὐστράτιος), a distinct Greek name associated with Saint Eustratius of Sebaste. Saint Eustace is known in Spanish as San Eustaquio and in Portuguese as Santo Eustáquio or Santo Eustácio.

The island's prior Dutch name was Nieuw Zeeland ('New Zeeland'), named by the Zeelanders who settled there in the 1630s. It was renamed Sint Eustatius shortly thereafter.

The Arawak name for the island was Aloi ("Cashew Island").

== History ==
=== Early history ===
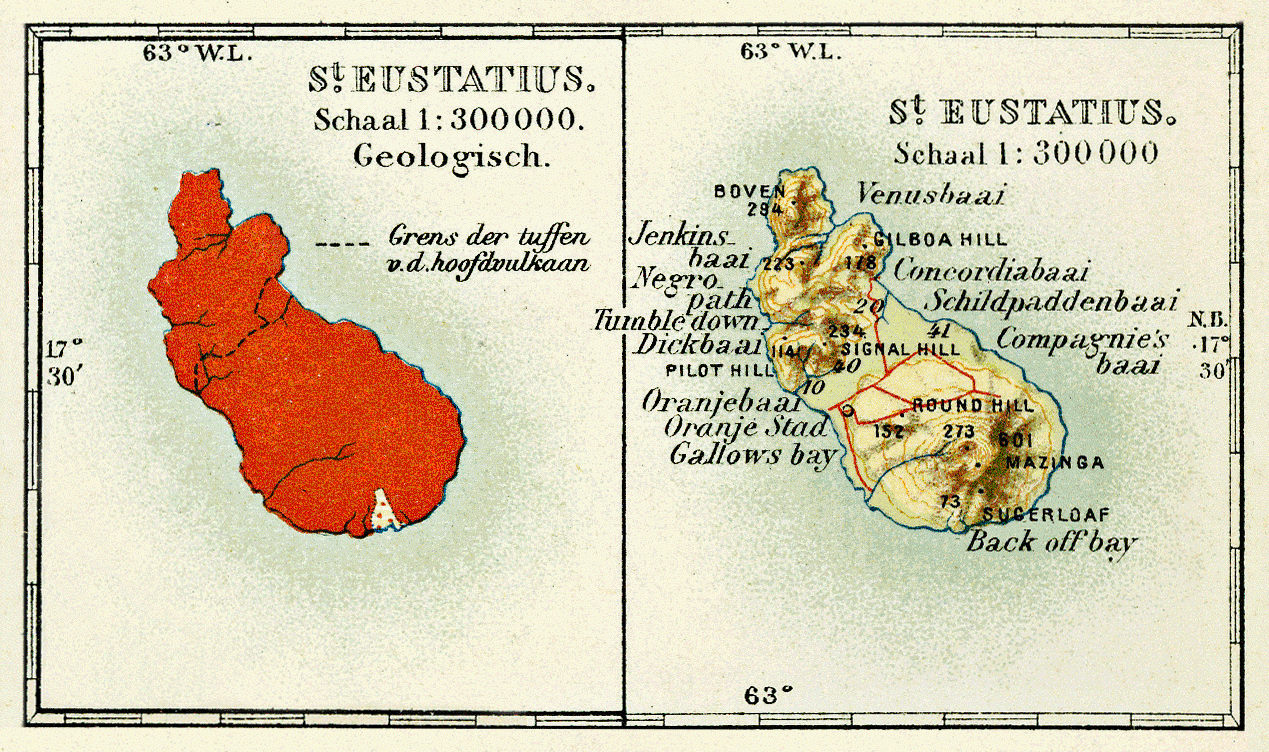
Map of Sint Eustatius from the Encyclopaedie van Nederlandsch West-Indië (1914–1917)

The earliest known inhabitants of Sint Eustatius were Arawaks, followed by Island Caribs. These populations migrated north from South America through the Lesser Antilles. Archaeological excavations in the early 20th century revealed pre-Columbian settlement traces at Orange Bay and Golden Rock, the latter of which serves as a site for studying early indigenous habitation on the island and is referred to as the "Golden Rock Site".

The first confirmed European sighting occurred in 1595 during a voyage by Francis Drake and John Hawkins. Following initial European settlement in the 17th century until the early 19th century, control of Sint Eustatius changed twenty-one times among the Netherlands, Great Britain, and France.

In 1625, English and French colonists arrived on the island. The French constructed a wooden battery in 1629 at the current location of Fort Oranje. Both groups abandoned the settlement within a few years due to limited fresh water resources.

=== Dutch West India Company rule ===
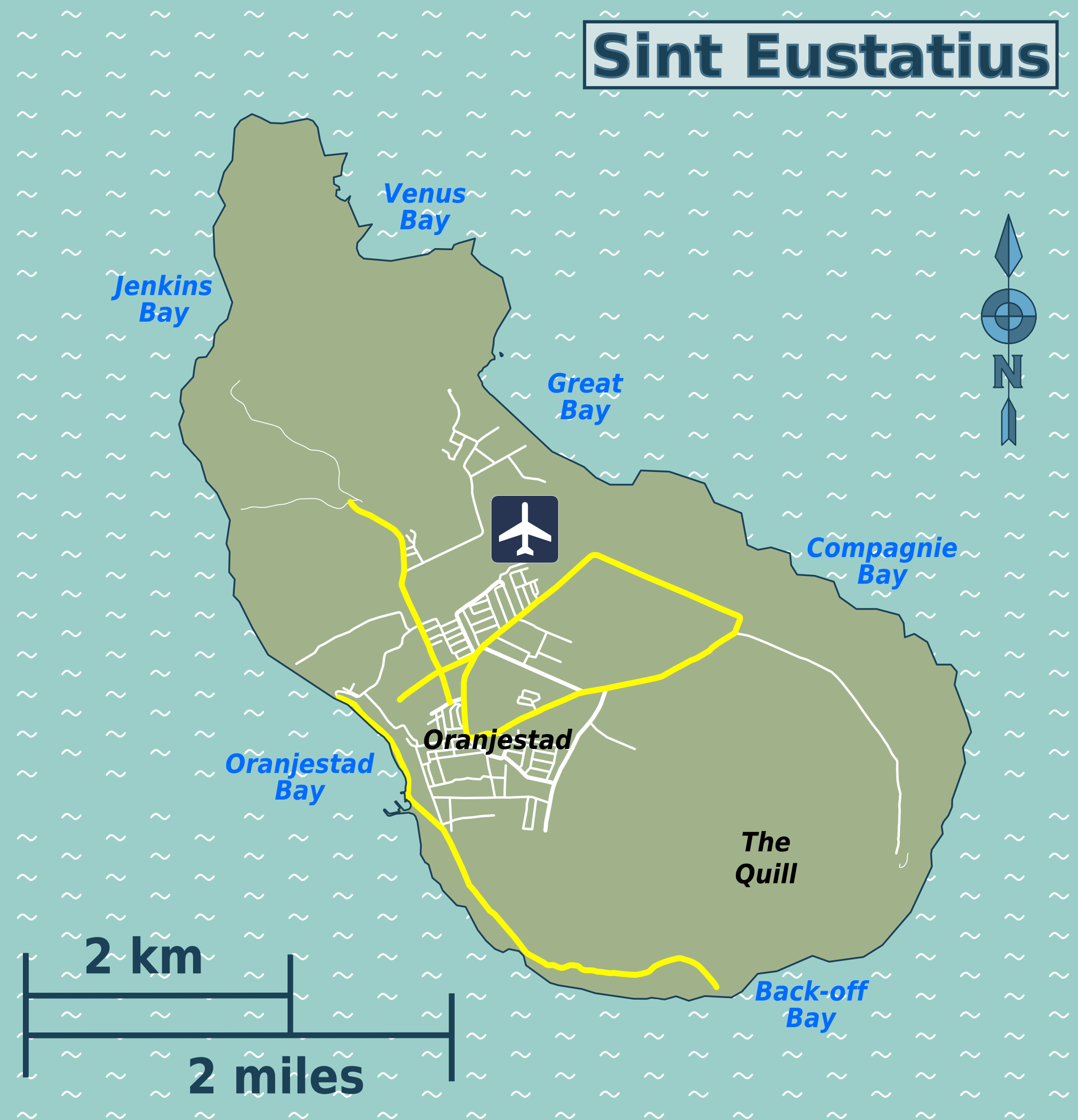
Modern topographical map of Sint Eustatius

In 1636, the Zeeland chamber of the Dutch West India Company (WIC) claimed ownership of the island, which was recorded as unoccupied at the time. By 1678, the islands of Sint Eustatius, Sint Maarten, and Saba fell under direct WIC administration, with a regional commander stationed at Sint Eustatius.

Initial commercial activities focused on the cultivation of tobacco and sugar, but the island's economic role shifted toward the transatlantic slave trade and intercolonial commerce.

=== Free port status and the slave trade ===
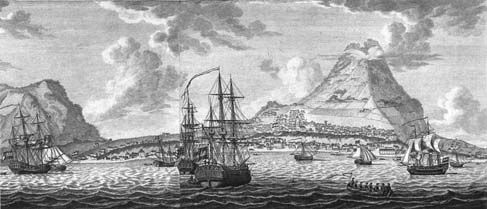
Historical engraving of the approach to Sint Eustatius from the Caribbean Sea

Sint Eustatius served as a transit depot for the transatlantic slave trade managed by the WIC. Plantation infrastructure developed across the island, utilizing enslaved labor to cultivate sugarcane, tobacco, cotton, coffee, and indigo. By 1774, records indicate there were 75 active plantations on the island, including Gilboa, Kuilzak, Zelandia, Zorg en Rust, Nooit Gedacht, Ruym Sigt, and Golden Rock.

By the mid-18th century, the island's geographic position combined with its large natural harbor and designation as a duty-free free port in 1756 established it as a major hub for commodity exchange, slave transshipment, and trade bypassing regional monopolies. To facilitate the intercolonial slave trade to neighboring islands, a two-story slave depot was constructed within the Waterfort complex, which was also known as Fortress Amsterdam, operating until around 1740. The depot typically housed between 400 and 450 people at any given time.

The expansion of the island economy earned it the moniker "The Golden Rock." In a 1781 parliamentary address, British statesman Edmund Burke described the commercial role of the island:

It has no produce, no fortifications for its defence, nor martial spirit nor military regulations ... Its utility was its defence. The universality of its use, the neutrality of its nature was its security and its safeguard. Its proprietors had, in the spirit of commerce, made it an emporium for all the world. ... Its wealth was prodigious, arising from its industry and the nature of its commerce.

=== "First Salute" ===
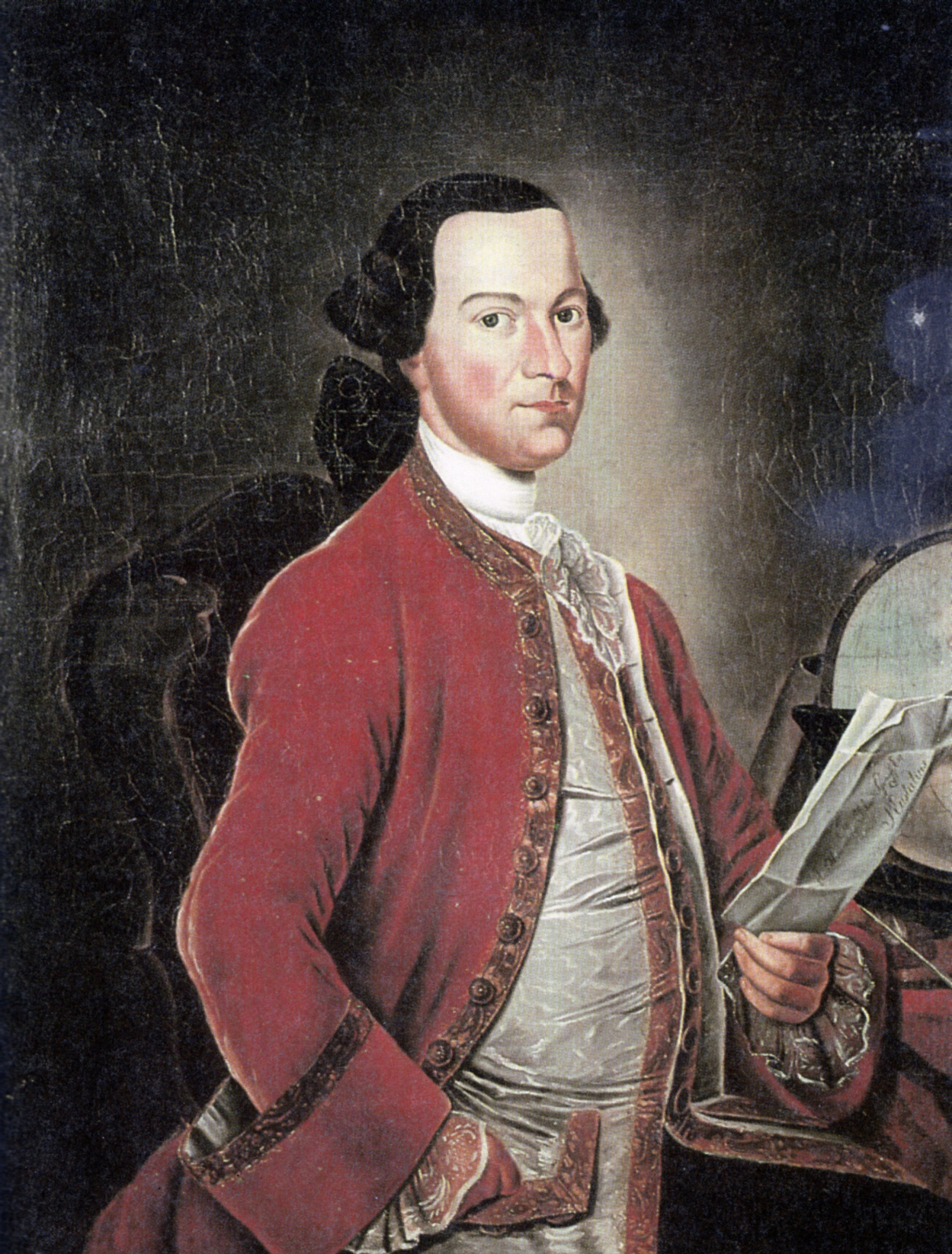
Governor Johannes de Graaff

During the American Revolutionary War, Sint Eustatius became a source of military supplies for the Continental forces, selling arms and ammunition to the American colonies. On 16 November 1776, the 14-gun American brig Andrew Doria, commanded by Captain Isaiah Robinson, entered the anchorage below Fort Oranje flying the Continental Colors. Robinson fired a thirteen-gun salute, representing the thirteen colonies. Governor Johannes de Graeff replied with an eleven-gun salute from the fort's cannons, conforming to international protocol that reduced the salute count when acknowledging a non-sovereign flag. This response constituted an early international recognition of an American vessel carrying the flag of the revolutionary forces.

The Andrew Doria subsequently purchased munitions on the island and delivered a copy of the Declaration of Independence to De Graeff. An earlier copy intended for Holland had been captured by the British wrapped in documents written in Yiddish addressed to Jewish merchants in Holland, which British authorities initially treated as a cipher.

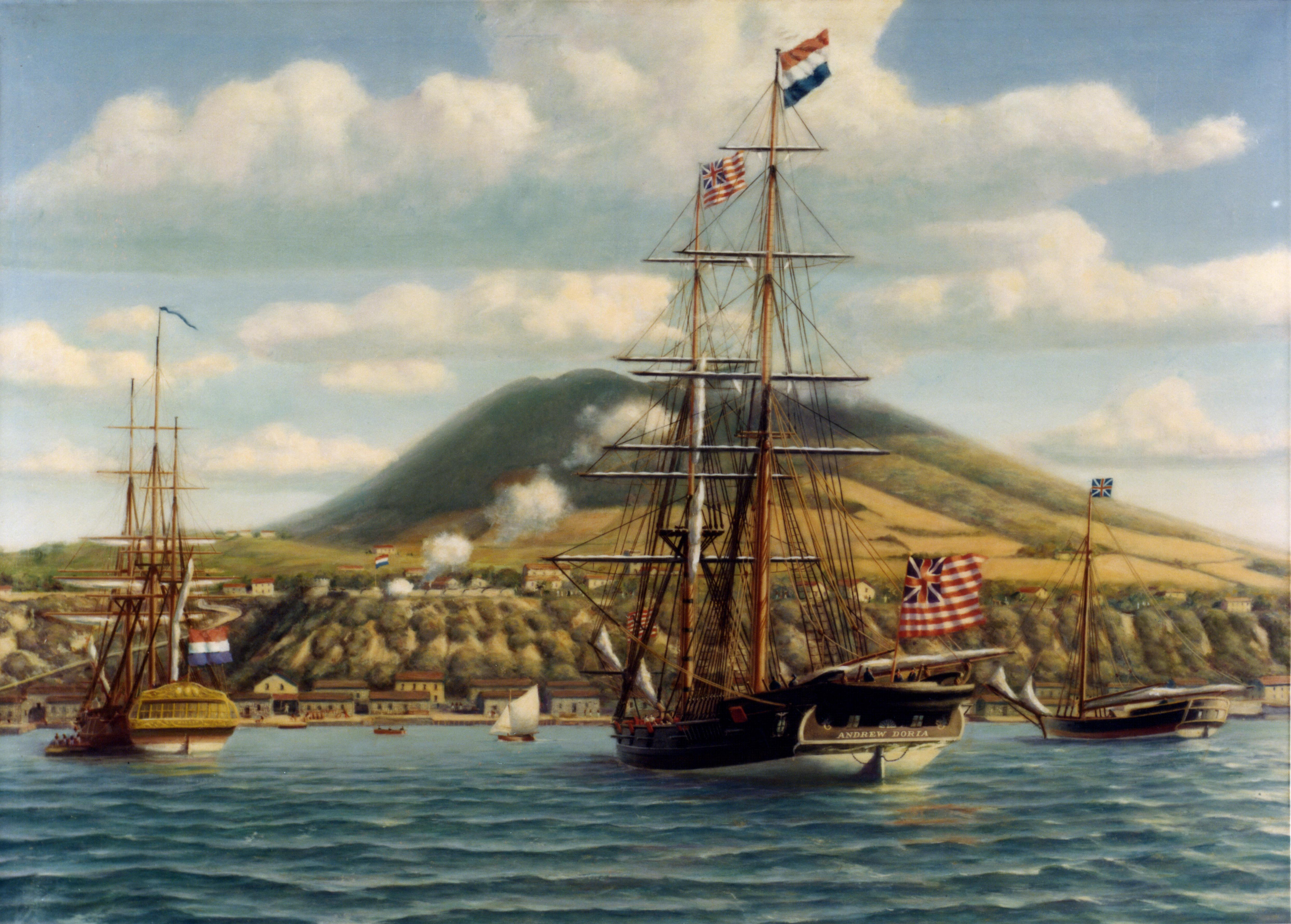
Depiction of the Andrew Doria receiving the "First Salute" from Fort Oranje, 16 November 1776

On 27 February 1939, U.S. President Franklin D. Roosevelt visited Sint Eustatius aboard the USS Houston to present a bronze plaque commemorating the 1776 salute. The plaque is mounted atop the walls of Fort Oranje, stating that "here the sovereignty of the United States of America was first formally acknowledged to a national vessel by a foreign official." The event provided the basis for historian Barbara W. Tuchman's 1988 study, The First Salute.

=== British capture and economic decline ===
Trade between Sint Eustatius and the United States served as a primary reason for Great Britain's declaration of war against the Dutch Republic, starting the Fourth Anglo-Dutch War (1780–1784). In 1778, Lord Stormont claimed in the British Parliament that "if Sint Eustatius had sunk into the sea three years before, the United Kingdom would already have dealt with George Washington", reflecting historical estimates that a substantial portion of American Revolutionary military supplies and communications passed through the island.

On 3 February 1781, a British fleet of 15 ships of the line under Admiral George Brydges Rodney arrived at the island with 3,000 troops. Unaware of the formal declaration of war, Governor De Graeff surrendered the island after firing two ceremonial rounds as a show of resistance in honor of Dutch Admiral Lodewijk van Bylandt, who commanded a ship in the harbor. British forces confiscated the island's commercial inventory, public stores, and private properties.

Ten months later, French forces captured the island. The Netherlands regained control over the territory in 1784 under the terms of peace negotiations. Subsequent French and British military occupations between 1795 and 1815 during the French Revolutionary and Napoleonic Wars disrupted regional trade routes. Sint Eustatius reverted to Dutch administration in 1816, but its commercial role did not recover as American merchant networks bypassed the port and regional trade shifted toward Curaçao and Sint Maarten. A census in 1790 recorded a total population of 8,124, which declined during the 19th and early 20th centuries, dropping to 921 by 1948.

=== Jewish community and the 1781 expulsion ===
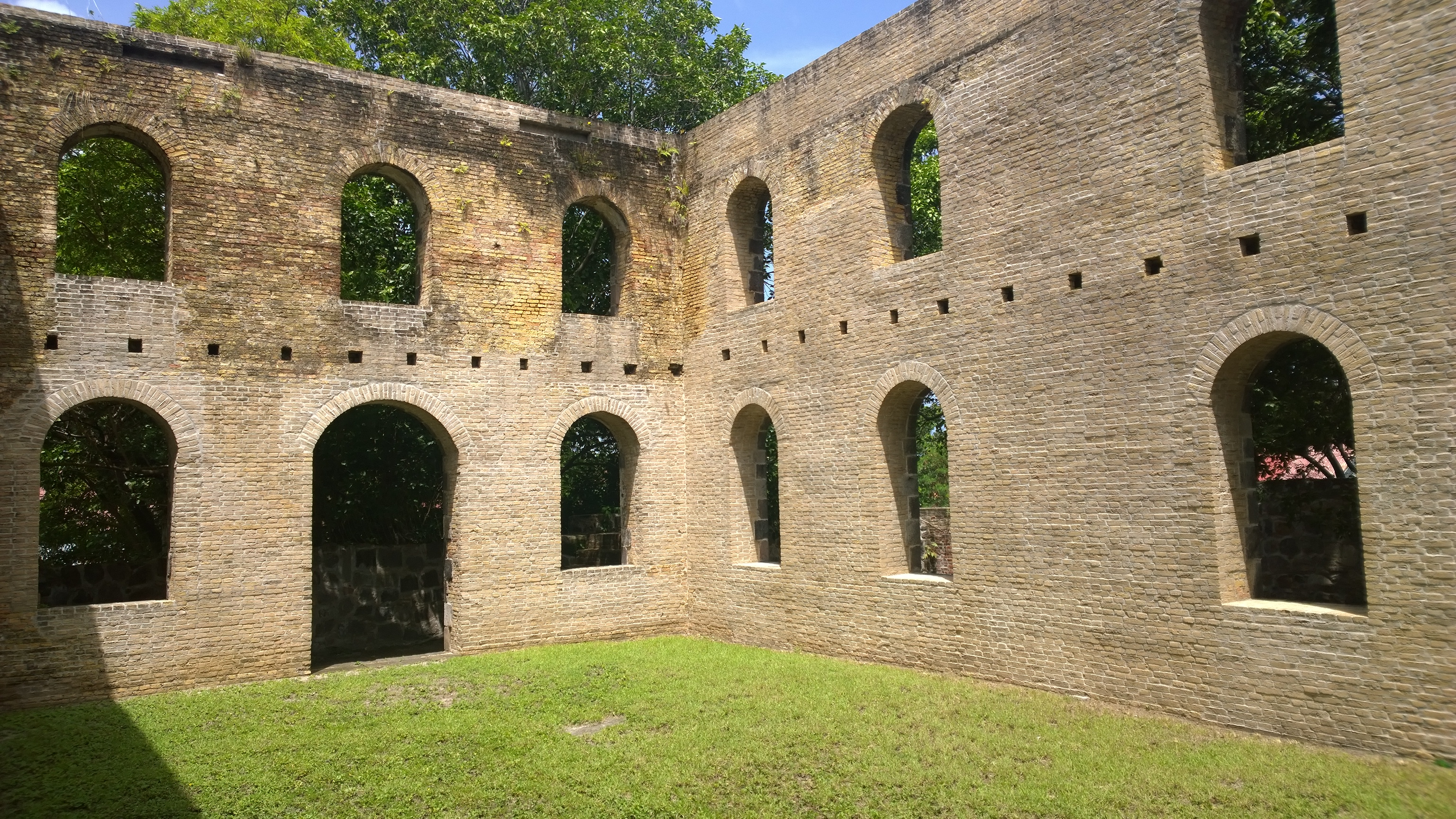
The stabilized structural walls of the Honen Dalim synagogue

Jewish merchants are documented on Sint Eustatius from 1660 onward, operating as traders, shipowners, and plantation operators. By 1750, Jewish residents constituted a significant portion of the island's free population, numbering over 450 individuals out of roughly 800 free citizens. The population comprised both Sephardic and Ashkenazi congregations. A 1781 census recorded that Jewish residents owned 86 enslaved people, amounting to approximately 6.4% of the island's total enslaved population.

Following the British capture of the island on 3 February 1781, Admiral Rodney targeted the Jewish community for retributive measures, citing their commercial support of the American and French forces in orders to Major-General Sir John Vaughan. On 13 February 1781, Rodney ordered the adult male Jewish population to assemble, and British forces deported 31 heads of Jewish families to neighboring St. Kitts. An additional 71 men were detained at the Lower Town weighing house for three days.

Subsequent expulsions targeted American merchants on 23 February, Amsterdam merchants on 24 February, and other Dutch and French citizens on 5 March. The crews of captured Dutch ships were imprisoned on St. Kitts. Many of the deported Jewish residents returned to Sint Eustatius after several weeks, finding their properties confiscated and sold at auction. One island council member, Pieter Runnels, died following detention aboard Rodney's flagship. British forces also searched properties, emptied warehouses, and damaged the local Jewish cemetery.

The measures enforced against the Jewish community became a subject of political debate in Great Britain. In February 1782, Edmund Burke condemned Rodney's actions during a parliamentary debate:

The persecution was begun with the people whom of all others it ought to be the care and the wish of human nations to protect, the Jews... They suffered in common with the rest of the inhabitants, the loss of their merchandise, their bills, their houses, and their provisions; and after this they were ordered to quit the island, and only one day was given them for preparation; they petitioned, they misrepresented against so hard a sentence, but in vain; it was irrevocable.

==== The synagogue and cemetery ====
The local synagogue, Honen Dalim, was established by the congregation in 1737. Official permission to construct the building was granted by the WIC in 1739, funded partly by donations from the Jewish community in Curaçao. This permission was granted on the condition that the house of worship be located where it would not interfere with Christian religious services. The structure was built off a small lane called Synagogue Path, separated from the main thoroughfares.

Following the decline of the island's commerce and the emigration of its merchants, the synagogue fell into disuse after 1815. In 2001, the stone perimeter walls of Honen Dalim were stabilized as part of the island's Historic Core Restoration Project. Archaeological excavations at the compound identified structural remnants of a ritual bath (mikveh) and an oven associated with Passover preparation. A historic Jewish cemetery is located adjacent to the Old Church Cemetery in Oranjestad.

=== Slave revolt of 1848 ===
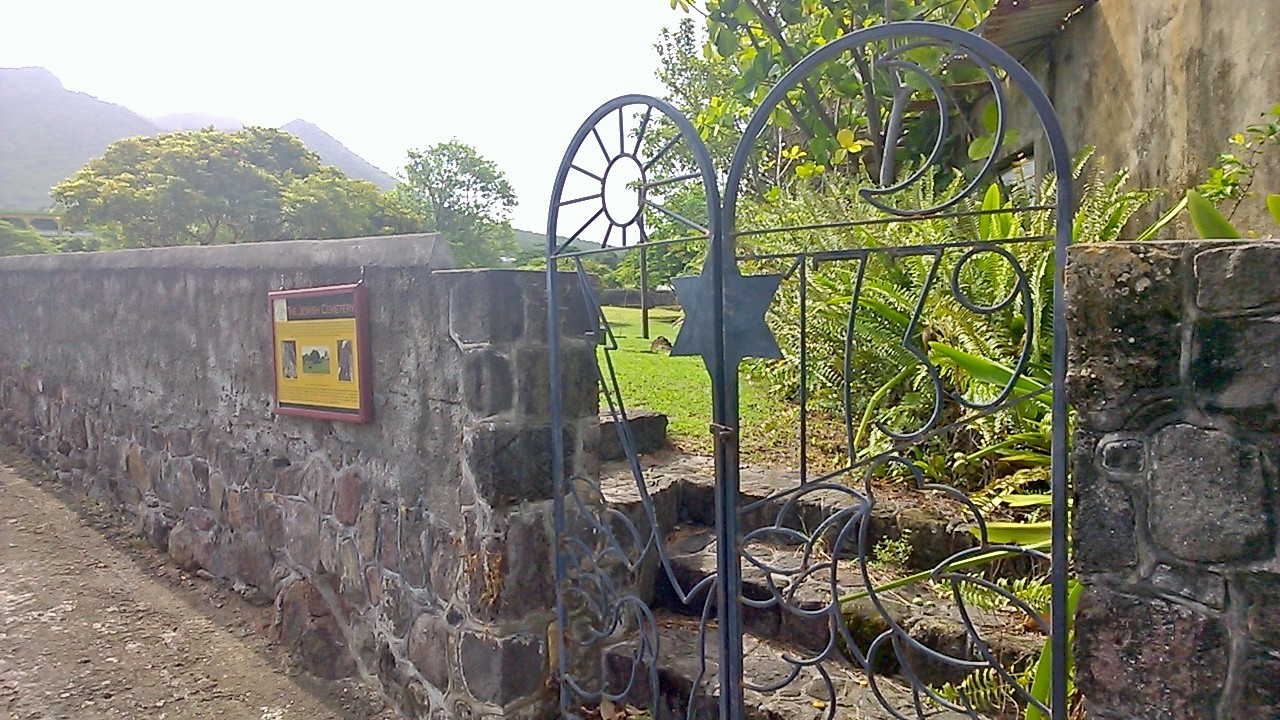
The historic Jewish cemetery on Sint Eustatius

The abolition of slavery in nearby French and British colonies led to labor unrest within Danish and Dutch Caribbean holdings. Following a June 1848 proclamation on French Sint Maarten granting freedom to enslaved persons, similar demands developed on Sint Eustatius.

On 12 June 1848, a group of free and enslaved Africans assembled outside the residence of Lieutenant Governor Johannes de Veer to demand emancipation, increased food provisions, and designated free hours. When the assembly did not disperse, the local militia was mobilized by the Colonial Council. Armed forces opened fire on the demonstrators, driving them from the town center to a nearby hill. A detachment of 35 militia members subsequently moved onto the hill, resulting in two deaths among the protestors and several injuries. Six leaders of the movement, including a free African named Thomas Dupersoy, were exiled to Curaçao. Following the event, several plantation owners on Sint Eustatius instituted wage labor policies prior to official emancipation.

=== Abolition of slavery to present day ===
The Netherlands officially abolished slavery in its colonies in 1863. Following emancipation, many formerly enslaved workers moved to Oranjestad. Without its original plantation labor base and major shipping trade, the island economy entered a recession, which was further affected by hurricanes in September 1928 and May 1929.

Sint Eustatius became an administrative component of the Netherlands Antilles upon its formation in 1954. During a status referendum on 8 April 2005, 77% of Sint Eustatius voters chose to maintain the Netherlands Antilles structure, while 21% voted for closer relations with the Netherlands. However, because the other member islands voted to dissolve the political union, the local island council chose to become a special municipality (openbaar lichaam) of the Netherlands, alongside Saba and Bonaire. This administrative transition was completed on 10 October 2010. The island replaced the Netherlands Antillean guilder with the United States dollar as its official currency in 2011.

== Geography ==
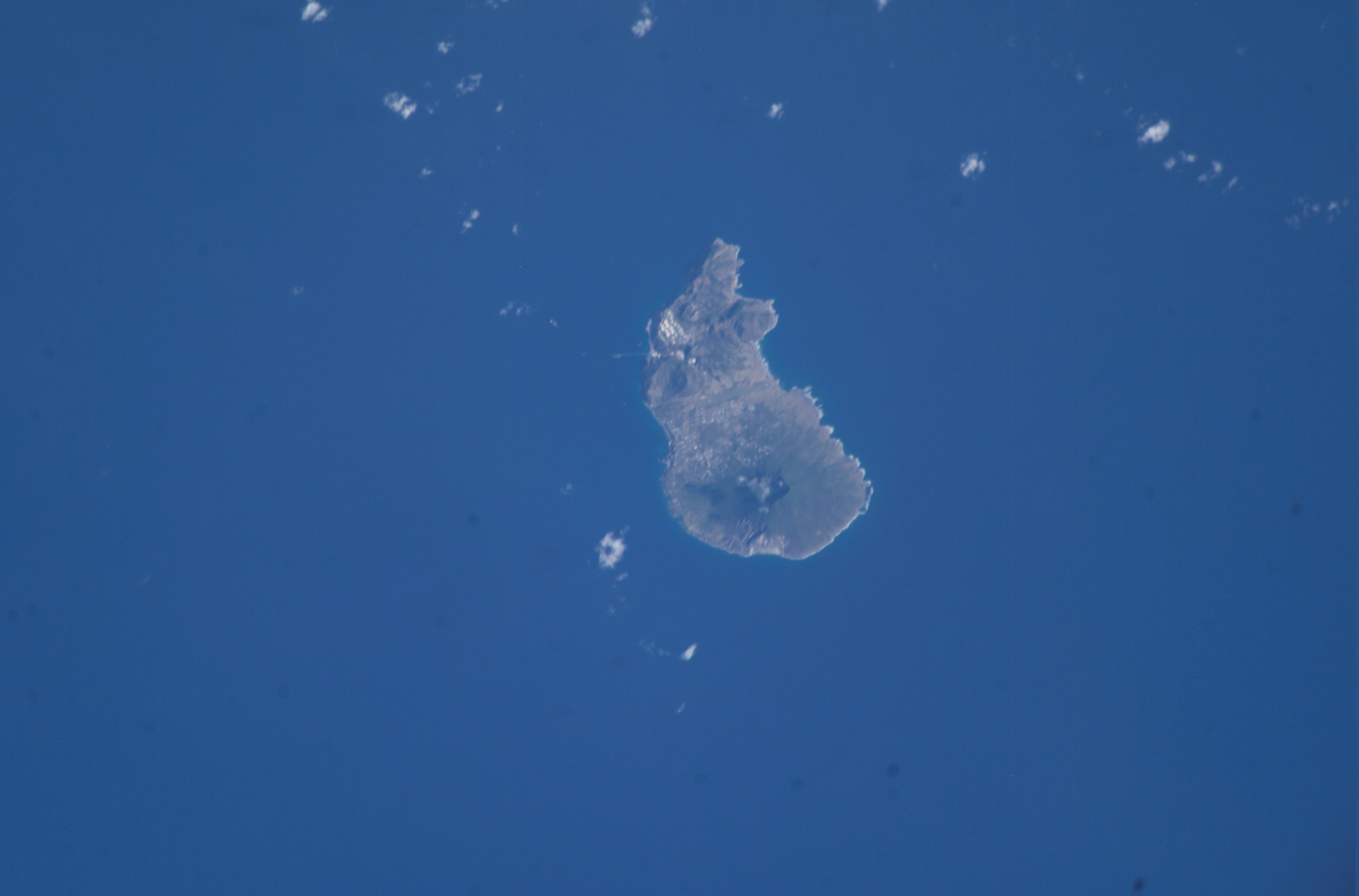
Sint Eustatius as photographed from the International Space Station

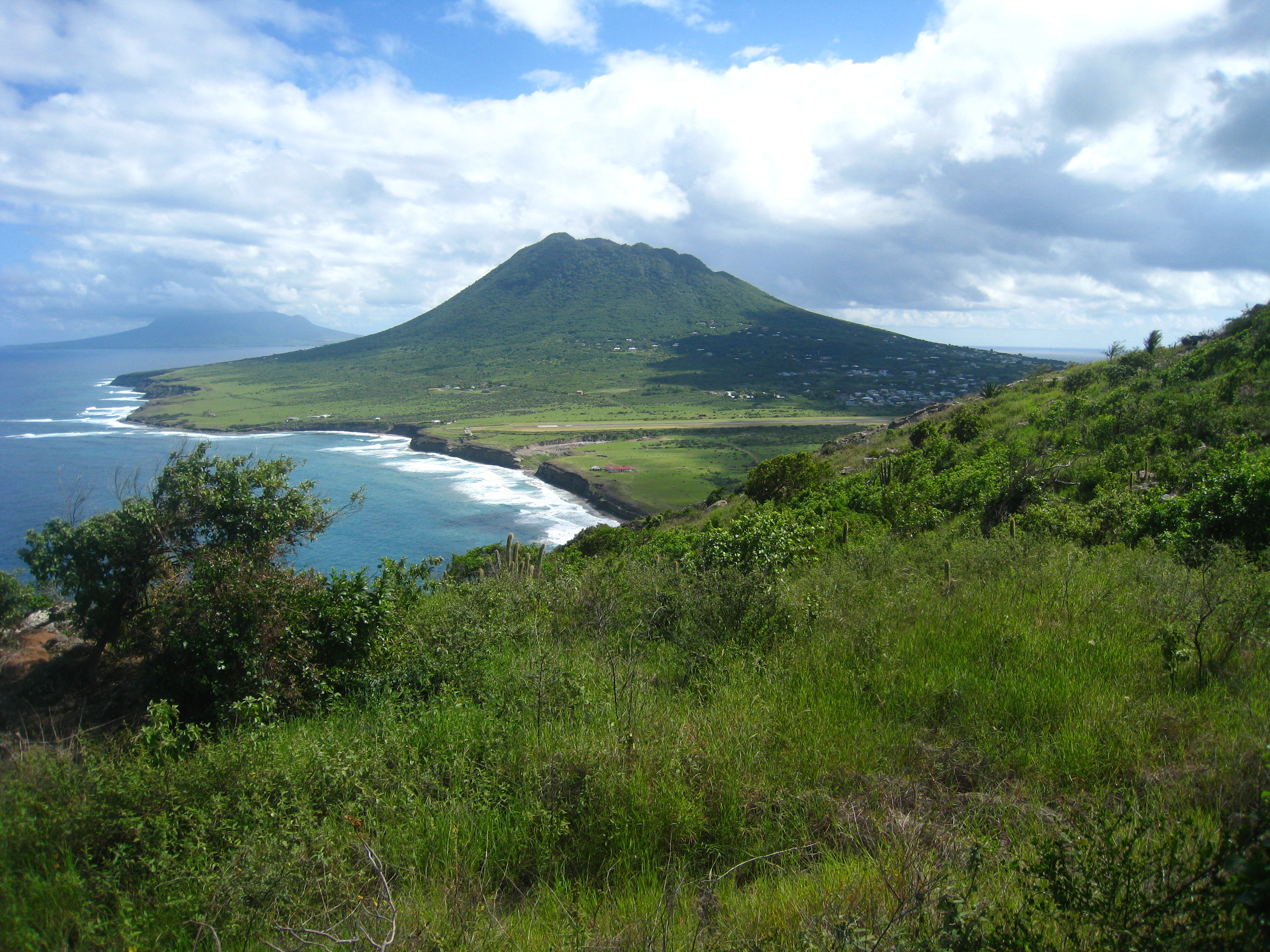
View looking southeast along the Atlantic coast, showing the airport runway in the middle distance, Lynch Beach beyond that, then the Quill, St. Eustatius's dormant volcano, and over the water in the distance, the northern end of the island of St. Kitts

Sint Eustatius is 6 miles (10 km) long and up to 3 miles (5 km) wide. Topographically, the island is saddle-shaped, with the 602-metre (1,975 ft) high dormant volcano Quill (Mount Mazinga), (from Dutch kuil, meaning 'pit'—originally referring to its crater) to the southeast and the smaller summits of Signal Hill/Little Mountain (or Bergje) and Boven Mountain to the northwest. The Quill crater is a popular tourist attraction on the island. The bulk of the island's population lives in the flat saddle between the two elevated areas, which forms the centre of the island.

=== Climate ===
St. Eustatius has a tropical monsoon climate. Tropical storms and hurricanes are common. The Atlantic hurricane season runs from 1 June to 30 November, sharply peaking from late August through September. Tropical Cyclone Climatology

=== Nature ===
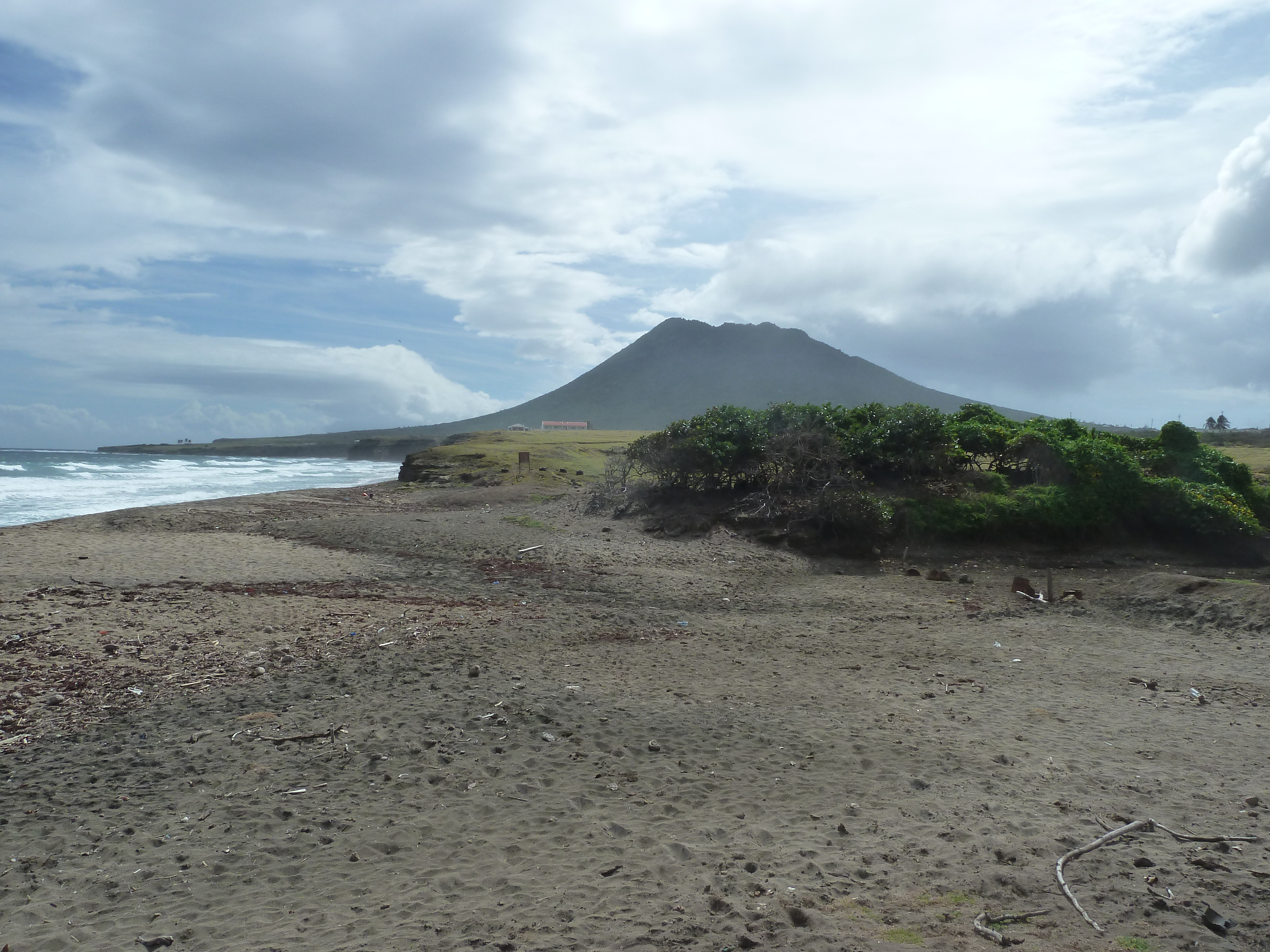
Zeelandia Beach

As St. Eustatius is a volcanic island and very small, all of the beaches on the island are made up of black volcanic sand. These volcanic sands, especially one of the more popular nesting beaches called Zeelandia, are very important nesting sites for several endangered sea turtles such as: the green turtle, leatherback, loggerhead and hawksbill.

Sint Eustatius is home to one of the last remaining populations of the critically endangered Lesser Antillean iguana (Iguana delicatissima). The population was strongly affected during the high-intensity hurricane year of 2017, with especially Hurricane Maria, during which the population declined by 25%.

=== National parks ===
Sint Eustatius has three nature parks – on land and at sea: the Sint Eustatius National Marine Park, Quill/Boven National Park, and Miriam Schmidt Botanical Garden. Two of them have national park status. These areas have been designated as important bird areas. The nature parks are maintained by the St Eustatius National Parks Foundation (STENAPA).

== Archaeology ==
Due to its turbulent history, Sint Eustatius is rich in archaeological sites. Nearly 300 sites have been documented. The island is said to have the highest concentration of archaeological sites of any area of comparable size. In the 1920s, J. P. B. de Josselin de Jong conducted archaeological research into Saladoid sites on the island and in the 1980s a great deal of research at the Golden Rock site was done by archaeologist Aad Versteeg of Leiden University. Around 1981, under the direction of archaeologist Norman F. Barka, the College of William & Mary in Williamsburg, Virginia also started archaeological research on Sint Eustatius. The documented archaeological sites include prehistoric sites, plantations, military sites, commercial trading sites (including shipwrecks), and urban sites (churches, government buildings, cemeteries, residences). The St. Eustatius Center for Archaeological Research (SECAR) has been conducting archaeological research on the island since 2004 including excavations at the Godet African Burial Ground and the Golden Rock African Burial Ground.

In June 2021, SECAR became involved in protests against excavations at the 18th-century burial ground Golden Rock on the island. The Ubuntu Connected Front and other concerned citizens of Sint Eustatius denounced the non-involvement of the community in the excavation process through a petition and letters to the government. The majority of the population on St. Eustatius are of African descent. Participation in cultural heritage, i.e. involving the community whose ancestors are being excavated, is good practice in contemporary archaeology. Archaeological excavations on St. Eustatius apparently fall under the old Monuments Act for the BES islands that is very brief on these issues. The 2016 Dutch Heritage Act offers more protection for cultural heritage. The Committee on Kingdom Relations asked State Secretary Raymond Knops questions about the matter. The Statia Heritage and Research Commission (SHRC) set up by the government of St. Eustatius investigated the allegations of the protest groups and published its report in January 2022.

== Demographics ==
=== Population ===
As of January 2025, the population was 3,270, with a population density of 154 inhabitants per square kilometre.

The majority of Sint Eustatius is of African descent, with minorities of European and Asian descent also present. Around 20 nationalities live on the island as well.

Age Sex Pyramid

=== Language ===
First languages of Sint Eustatians (2021)
| Languages | Percent |
| English | 81.2% |
| Spanish | 12.8% |
| Dutch | 3.6% |
| Papiamentu | 1.1% |
| Other | 1.2% |

Languages spoken in Sint Eustatius (2021)
| Languages | Percent |
| English | 93.6% |
| Dutch | 38.2% |
| Spanish | 31.5% |
| Papiamentu | 18.5% |
| Other | 3.4% |

The official language is Dutch, but English is the "language of everyday life" on the island and education is solely in English. A local English-based creole is also spoken informally. More than 52% of the population speak more than one language. The most widely spoken languages are English (92.7%), Dutch (36%), Spanish (33.8%) and Papiamento (20.8%).

=== Religion ===
The population of Sint Eustatius is predominantly Christian. The main denominations are Methodism (28.6%), Roman Catholicism (23.7%), Seventh-Day Adventist (17.8%), Pentecostalism (7.2%) and Anglicanism (2.6%).

Religion in Sint Eustatius (2018):
1. Protestant (56.2%)
2. Roman Catholic (23.7%)
3. Other Christian denomination or religion (5.20%)
4. No denomination (14.9%)

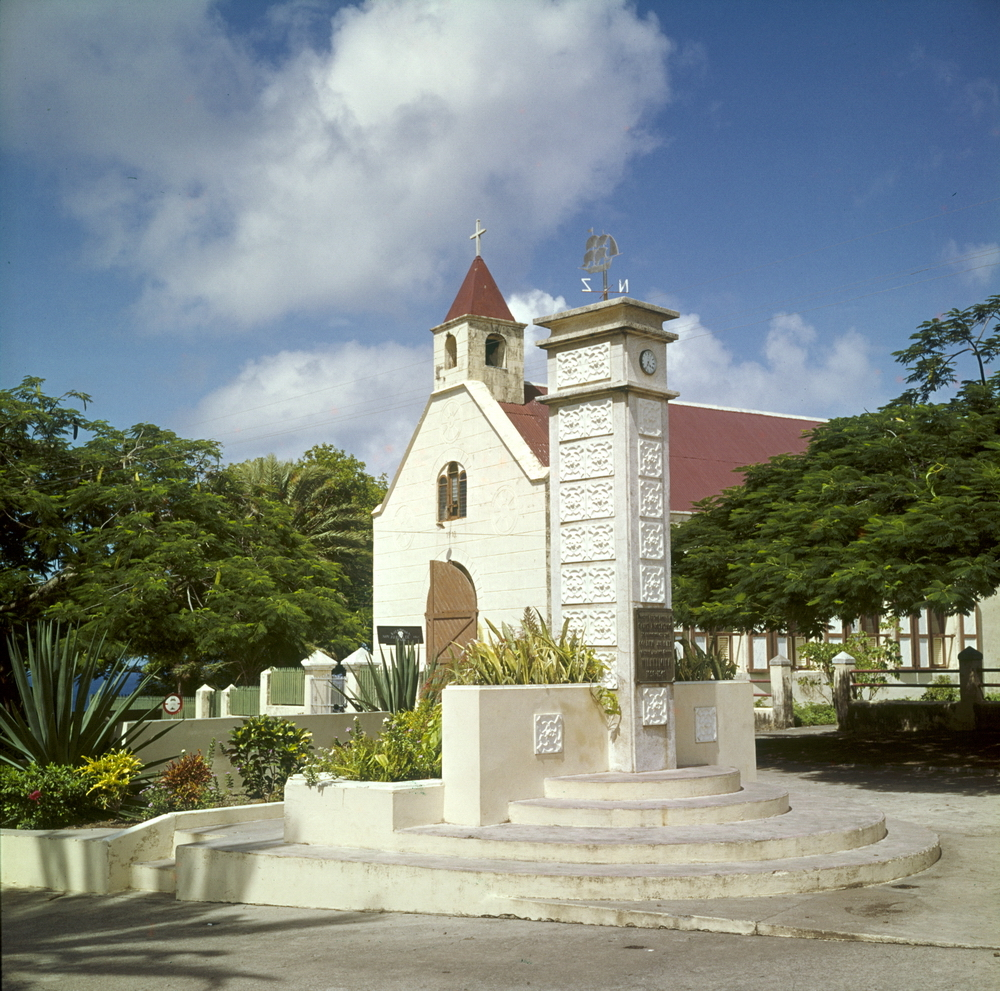
Catholic church in Sint Eustatius

== Economy ==
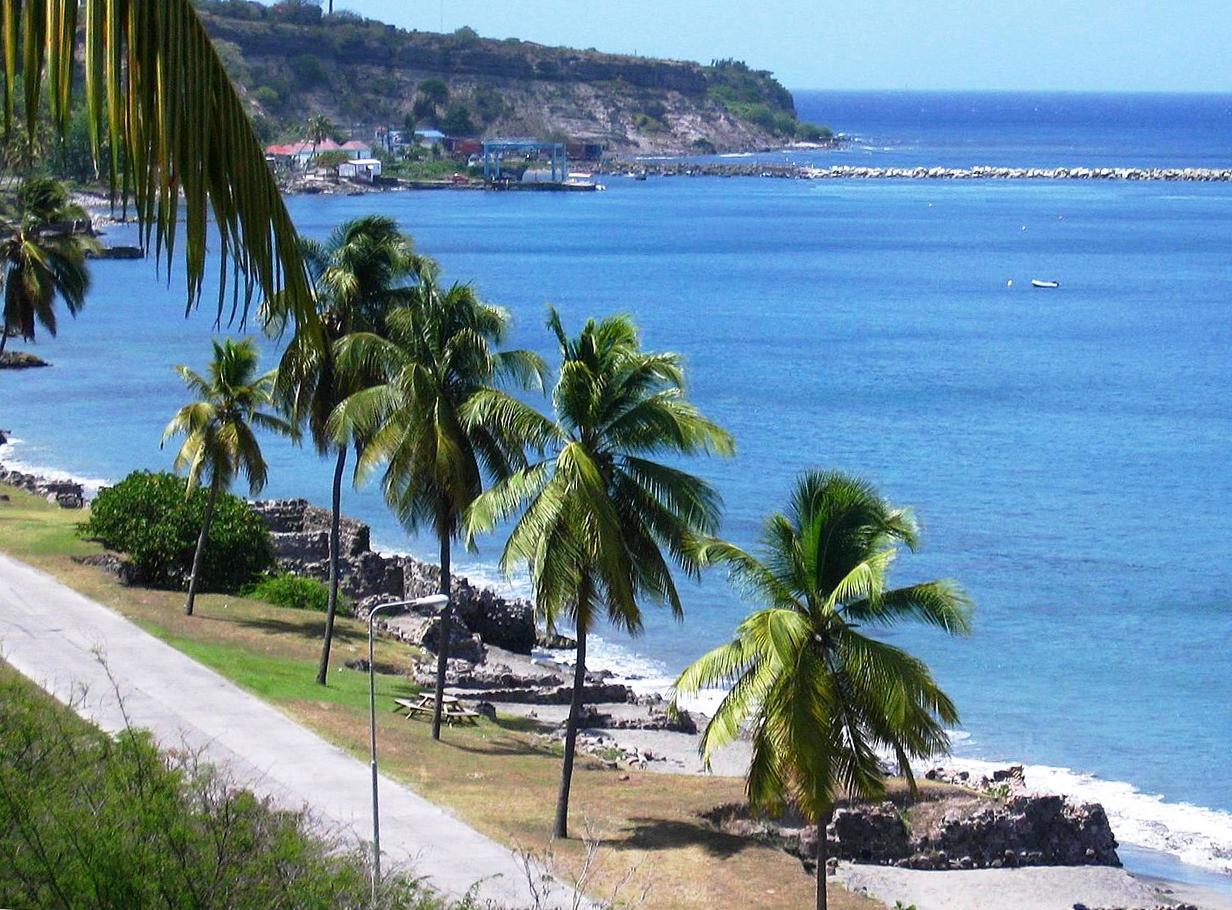
Ruins of numerous warehouses on Oranje Bay

In the 18th century, "Statia" was the most important Dutch island in the Caribbean and was a center of great wealth from trading. At this time it was known as the "Golden Rock" because of its immense wealth. A very large number of warehouses lined the road that runs along Oranje Bay; most (but not all) of these warehouses are now ruined and some of the ruins are partially underwater.

A French occupation in 1795 was the beginning of the end of great prosperity for Sint Eustatius.

The government is the largest employer on the island, and the oil terminal owned by GTI Statia is the largest private employer.

=== Energy and water ===
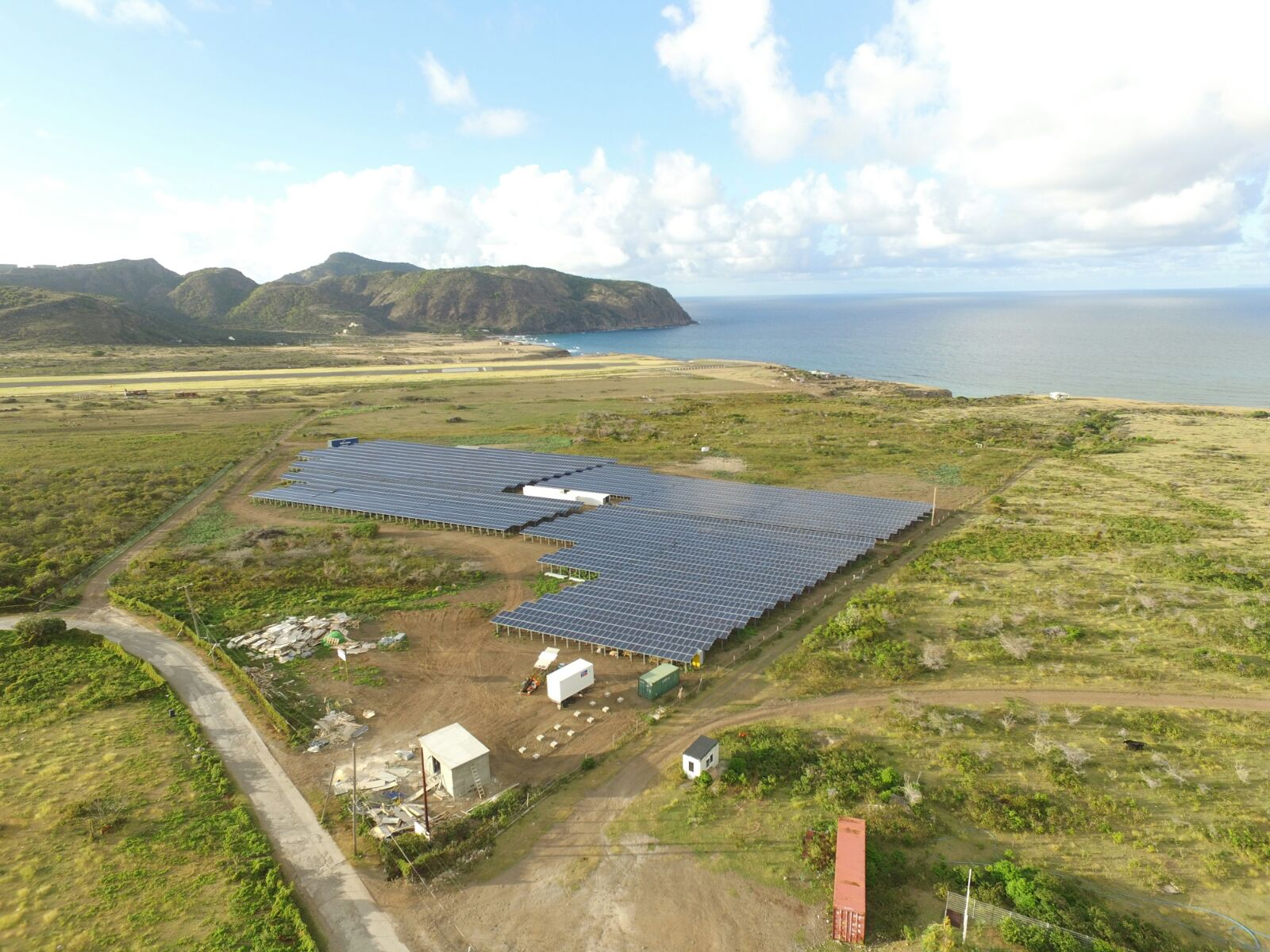
The solar park on Sint Eustatius in 2016

Statia Utility Company N.V. provides electricity to the island, as well as drinking water per truck and on part of the island by a water network. The electricity supply is rapidly being made green. Until 2016 all electricity was produced by diesel generators. In March 2016 the first phase of the solar park with 1.89 MWp capacity became operational, covering 23% of entire electricity demand. In November 2017 another 2.15 MWp was added, totaling 14,345 solar panels, with 4.1 MW capacity and a yearly production of 6.4 GWh. The solar park includes lithium-ion batteries of 5.9 MWh size. These provide power for grid stability, as well as energy shifting. On a sunny day the diesel generators are switched off from 9 a.m. to 8 pm. This is made possible by grid-forming inverters produced by SMA. This is one of the first such solar parks in the world and provides 40% to 50% of the island's electricity.

== Transportation ==
The F. D. Roosevelt Airport (IATA: EUX) offers flights to Sint Maarten and Anguilla.

As of March 2025, Makana operated ferries six days a week to and from Philipsburg on the Dutch part of Sint Maarten, with continuing service to the Dutch island of Saba, as well as a direct ferry link to and from St. Kitts (Port Zante in Basseterre).

There is no regularly scheduled public transportation, such as public buses or minibuses, on Statia.

== Education ==
Dutch government policy towards St. Eustatius and other SSS islands promoted English medium education. Sint Eustatius had bilingual English–Dutch education. Since 2014, however, education has been conducted solely in English.

Gwendoline van Putten School (GVP) is a secondary school on the island.

Other schools include: Golden Rock School, Gov. de Graaff School, Methodist School, SDA School.

== Sports ==
The most popular sports on Sint Eustatius are football, futsal, softball, basketball, swimming and volleyball. Due to the small population, there are few sport associations. One of them, the Sint Eustatius Volleyball Association, is a member of ECVA and NORCECA. Currently St. Eustatius is a non-active member of the Caribbean zone of Pony Baseball and Softball leagues.

== Notable residents ==
- Mariana Franko (1718–1779), freedom fighter
- Antony Beaujon (c. 1763–1805), colonial governor
- Edward Wilmot Blyden (1832–1912), educator and diplomat; born in Saint Thomas from Statian parents
- Gerald Berkel (b. 1969), politician
- Black Harry (18th century), Methodist preacher
- Kizzy (b. 1979), artist
- Lolita Euson (1914–1994), writer and poet
- Ziggi Recado (b. 1981), artist
- Shirma Rouse (b. 1980), singer

== See also ==
- Caribbean Netherlands
- Dissolution of the Netherlands Antilles
- Governors of Sint Eustatius, Saba and Sint Maarten
- F. D. Roosevelt Airport
- Great Hurricane of 1780
- Index of Netherlands Antilles-related articles
- Plantations of Sint Eustatius
