= Godet African Burial Ground =

Burial ground in the Dutch Caribbean

Coordinates: 17°29′10.1″N 62°59′33.6″W

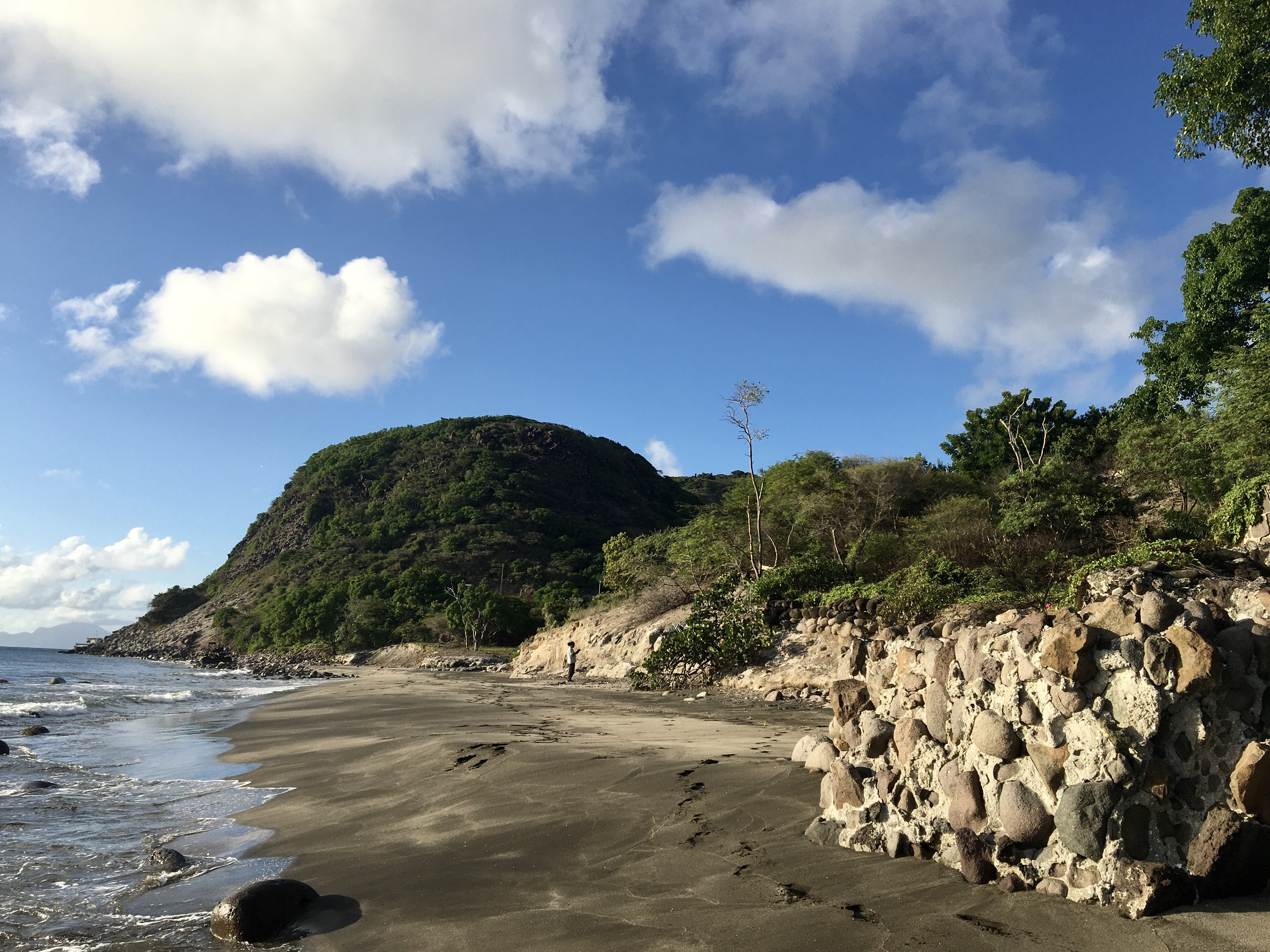
Ruins of the Water Fort St. Eustatius with in the background the Godet burial ground

The Godet African Burial Ground is an unmarked historical burial ground for enslaved African men, women and children located at the southwest coast of Sint Eustatius, Dutch Caribbean. The burial ground was part of the former Godet plantation on the island.

== The Godet plantation ==
There was no large plantation economy on the island, yet by 1750 there were 76 plantations. The burial ground was part of the former Godet Plantation. Plantation buildings are often depicted on maps, sometimes including the housing for the enslaved people. The burial grounds of the enslaved people are, however, seldom marked. It seems that the enslaved people were allowed to bury their dead at the least profitable ground or waste land of the plantations. The location of the Godet Afrikan Burial Ground is a good example of this as it is situated at the edge of a cliff.

== Location near the Waterfort ==
The Godet African Burial Ground is located just north of the fortress Amsterdam also known as the Waterfort. Sint Eustatius was an important transit port in the trans-Atlantic slave trade and intercolonial slave trade due to its strategic location, deep harbor and system of free trade. The transshipment of captured Africans to the British, French, and Spanish islands of the eastern Caribbean was significant enough that colonists constructed a building inside the Waterfort. This building served as a depot of enslaved Africans for the Dutch West India Company until around 1740. It housed about 450 people. Women and children were housed on the second floor.

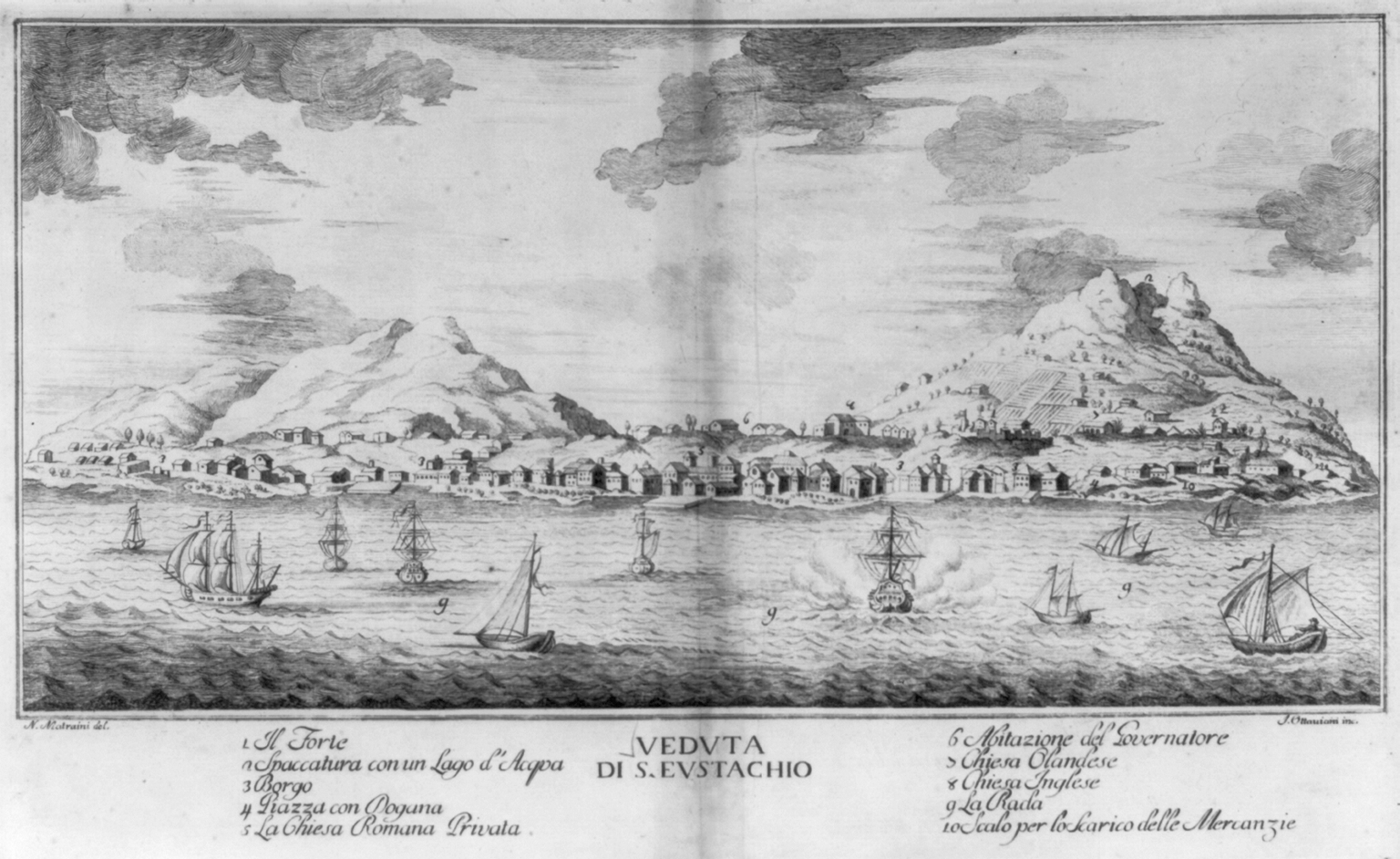
Gezicht op de westkust van Sint Eustatius - N. Matraini del. ; J. Ottaviani, 1777. Library of Congress

== Archaeological excavations ==
In 2012, archaeological investigations were conducted, which led to rescue excavations of eroding burials. In 2018, field work at the Godet site was conducted in a collaboration between Texas State University and the St. Eustatius Center for Archaeological Research (SECAR) as part of a Research Experiences for Undergraduates (REU) program sponsored by the National Science Foundation. Outcome of this archaeological research was that the burial ground was most likely associated with the Godet Plantation or the slave depot within the Waterfort. This indicates that the burial ground contains Africans who were born in Africa as well as those who had lived on the island for some time.

The excavations were later criticized for a lack of transparency and community involvement.

== Commemoration ==
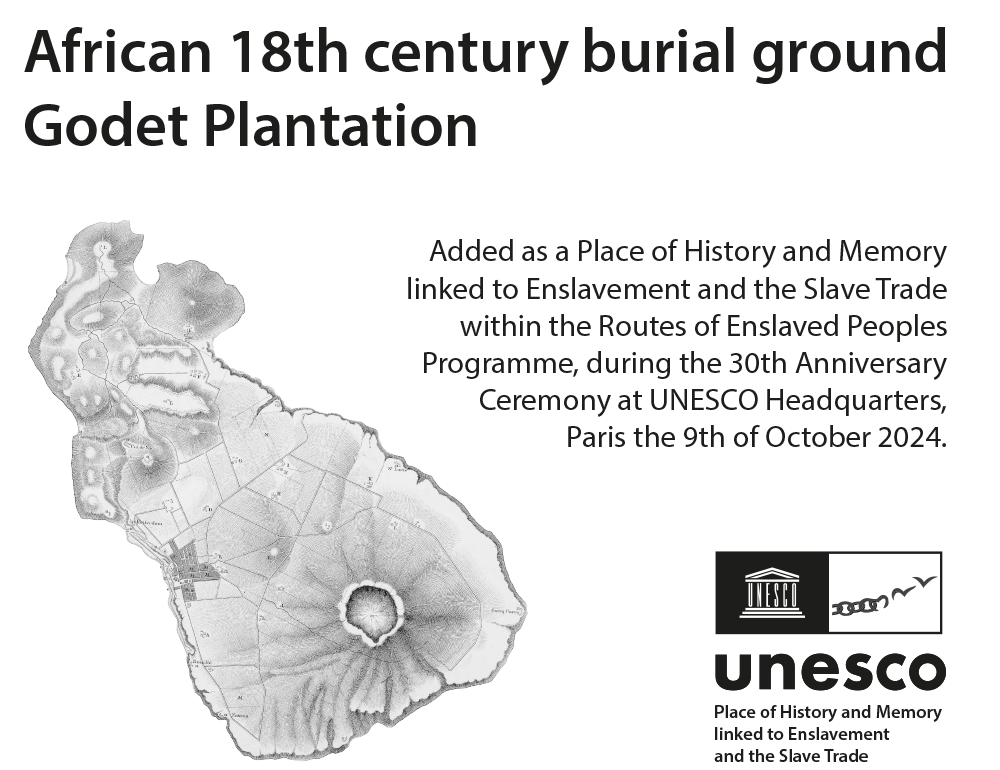
The Unesco Godet Rock plaque for the African 18th century burial ground of the Godet Plantation as part of the Routes of Enslaved Peoples Programme under which the burial ground was recognized as a Place of history and memory linked to enslavement and the slave trade

The Godet African Burial Ground is of historical importance to the African descendant population of Sint Eustatius. Students at the local Gwendoline van Putten secondary school often perform a play, poems or songs commemorating the suffering and strength of their ancestors.

Protests by the inhabitants of Sint Eustatius against the controversial excavations on the Godet burial ground as well as the Golden Rock African Burial Ground led to increased awareness and attention for the African cultural heritage on the island. In December 2022, the St. Eustatius Afrikan Burial Ground Alliance organized a walking tour to the Godet African burial ground and inhabitants held a libation for their ancestors. UNESCO Netherlands Committee applied for the label “Routes of Enslaved Peoples” for the Godet site as well as the Golden Rock African Burial Ground in November 2022. On October 9, 2024, the two historical cemeteries were inscribed as part of “UNESCO's Network of Places of History and Memory linked to Enslavement and the Slave Trade” during the 30th anniversary celebration of the “Routes of Enslaved Peoples” programme.
