= Jay Haviser =

American-born archaeologist and anthropologist

Jay Bryant Haviser, Jr.
- Born: November 21, 1955 (age 70); Bartow, Florida, U.S.
- Citizenship: American / Netherlands
- Education: Florida State University (BA, MS), Leiden University (Ph.D.)
- Known for: Caribbean prehistory and archaeology
- Scientific career
- Fields: Archaeology, Anthropology
- Workplaces: St. Maarten Archaeological Center (SIMARC), Leiden University

Jay Bryant Haviser, Jr. (born November 21, 1955, Bartow, Florida) is an American-born archaeologist and anthropologist who has conducted archaeological fieldwork in St. Martin,Curacao, and other islands in the Eastern Caribbean. Haviser received a BA and a MS from Florida State University, US, and received a Ph.D. in 1987 from the Royal University of Leiden, T for a dissertation= "Amerindian Cultural Geography on Curaçao". His findings are published internationally and form the basis of our knowledge about the prehistory of these islands. Haviser is director of the St. Maarten Archaeological Center (SIMARC), and formerly was the Archaeologist for the Netherlands Antilles Govt. (AAINA), and a researcher at Leiden University, the Netherlands and has formerly served as President of the International Association of Caribbean Archaeology. He lives in St. Maarten.

== Works ==
=== African Sites: Archaeology in the Caribbean ===
African Sites: Archaeology in the Caribbean is a book by Jay Haviser, first published in 1999 by Markus Weiner Publishers.

The book's publisher states that "This book examines archaeological research about African peoples who were brought to the Caribbean, as well as their descendants in the twentieth century. These contributions cover a wide geographic sample of regions and range from Caribbean studies to individual investigations on 12 different islands of the English, Dutch, Spanish, and French territories."

The book has been reviewed by publications including The Hispanic American Historical Review, International Journal of African Historical Studies, and North American Archaeologist.

=== African Re-Genesis: Confronting Social Issues in the Diaspora ===
African Re-Genesis: Confronting Social Issues in the Diaspora is a book by Jay Haviser and Kevin C. MacDonald, first published in 2008 by Routledge.

The book has been reviewed by publications including Azania: Archaeological Research in Africa and African Diaspora Archaeology Newsletter.

The World Archaeological Congress stated that African Re-Genesis "is the first book to emphasise the relevancy of current research to contemporary issues in diaspora communities. The contributions to this book demonstrate how the spirit of Africa has survived and re-emerged through contacts with new environments and cultures."
