= Waterfort (Sint Eustatius) =

Fortress on Sint Eustatius

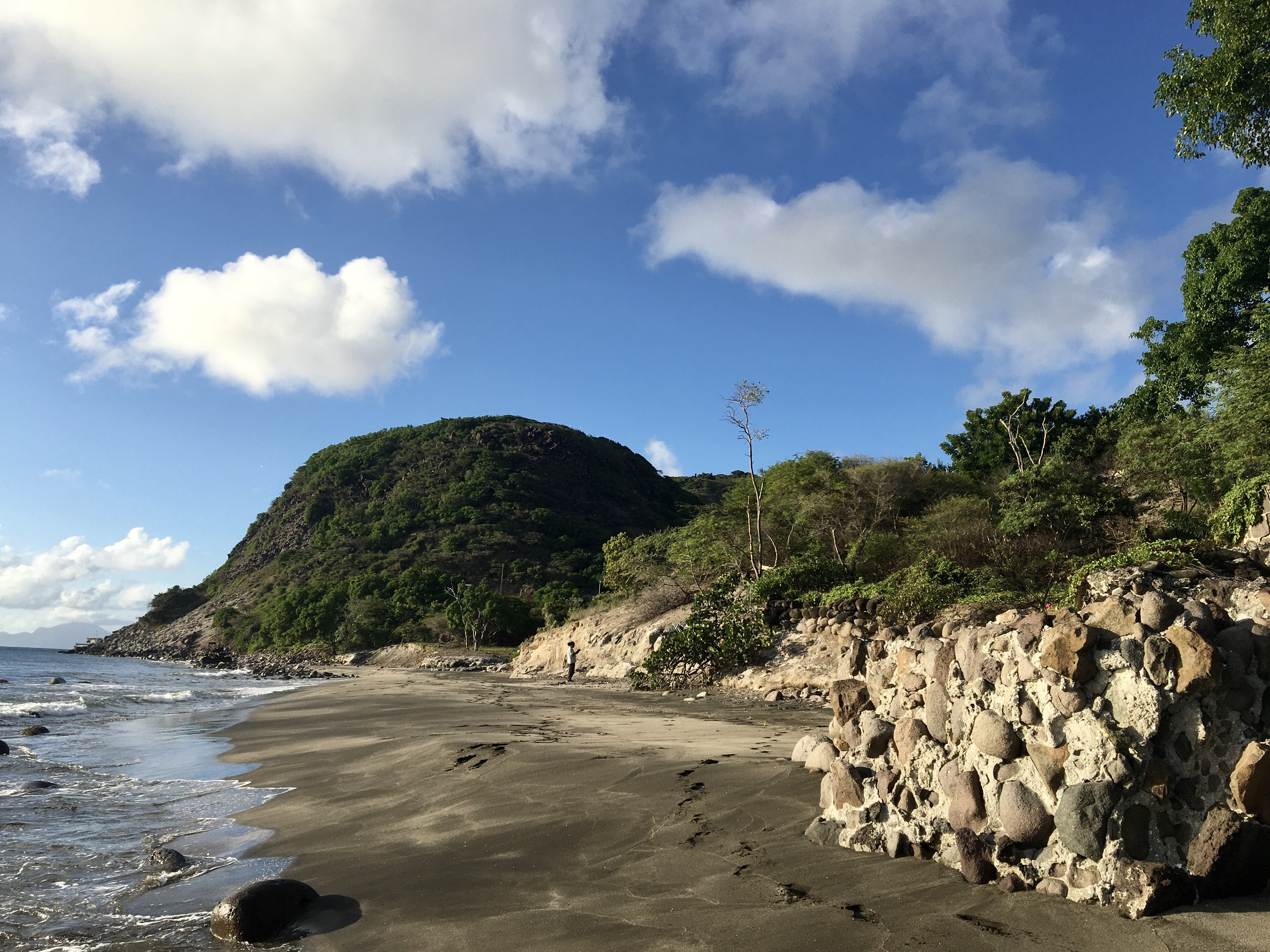
Ruins of the Water Fort St. Eustatius with the Godet burial ground in the background

The Waterfort, also called Fort Amsterdam, is a fortress on the southwest coast of Sint Eustatius, Dutch Caribbean, of which only ruins remain. It is one of the sixteen known fortresses on Sint Eustatius and is threatened by sea currents and surf.

The fort housed a two-storey slave house built by Commander Johannes Lindesay between 1724 and 1726 and served as such until around 1740. The slave house housed about 450 people. Women and children were housed on the second floor. In the 18th century, Sint Eustatius was the most profitable asset of the Dutch West India Company and a transit point for enslaved Africans in the transatlantic slave trade.

The fort guarded the entrance to the Oranjebaai of Sint Eustatius, where ships brought goods for the warehouses in the lower town.

Just north of the fort is the historic Godet African Burial Ground with the invisible graves of enslaved African men, women and children.

== See also ==
- Fortification
- History of slavery
- Netherlands Antilles
