= Gaspar =

Gaspar is a given and/or surname of French, German, Portuguese, and Spanish origin, cognate to Casper (given name) or Casper (surname).

It is a name of christian origin, per Saint Gaspar, one of the three wise men mentioned in the Armenian Infancy Gospel.

Notable people with the name include:

== Mononyms ==
- Saint Gaspar (54 BC-55 AD), visitor to baby Jesus
- Gaspar (footballer, born 1981), Odirlei de Souza Gaspar, Brazilian football striker
- Gaspar (Angolan footballer) (born 1997), Kialonda Gaspar, Angolan football defender
- Gaspar (footballer, born 2002), Luis Eduardo Gaspar Coelho, Brazilian football forward

== Given name ==
- Gaspar Araújo (born 1981), Portuguese long jumper
- Gaspar Azevedo (born 1975), Portuguese footballer
- Gaspar Cassadó (1897–1966), Spanish cellist and musical composer
- Gaspar Corte-Real (1450–1501), Portuguese explorer
- Gaspar Flores de Abrego (1781–1836), three-time mayor of San Antonio, Texas
- Gaspar del Bufalo (1786-1837), saint, priest, and founder of the Missionaries of the Precious Blood.
- Gaspar DiGregorio (1905–1970), Italian-American organized-crime figure
- Gaspar Fagel (1634–1688), Dutch statesman
- Gaspar Fernandes (1566–1629), Portuguese musical composer
- Gaspar Gálvez Burgos (born 1979), Spanish footballer known simply as Gaspar
- Gaspar Lococo, co-founder of Funtime, Inc.
- Gaspar Melchor de Jovellanos (1744–1811), Spanish neoclassical statesman, author, philosopher
- Gaspar Méndez (fl. 1546), Spanish architect of Badajoz
- Gaspar Méndez de Haro, 7th Marquis of Carpio (1629–1687), Spanish political figure
- Gaspar Milazzo (1887–1930), Italian-American organized-crime figure
- Gaspar Noé (born 1963), Argentine-born, French-based filmmaker
- Gaspar de Portolá (1716–1786), Spanish soldier and politician
- Gaspar Saladino (1927–2016), American comic book letterer and logo designer
- Gaspar Sanz (1640–1710), Aragonese baroque composer, guitarist, organist and priest
- Gaspar Ventura (born 1955), Spanish water polo player
- Gaspar Yanga (1545–after 1618), leader of successful 1570 slave revolt in Mexico
- Manuel Gaspar Haro (born 1981), Spanish footballer

== Surname ==
- Acsinte Gaspar (1937–2025), Romanian judge and politician
- Alfredo Rodrigues Gaspar (1865–1938), Portuguese military officer and politician
- Alvaro Gaspar Pinto (1912–1969), Portuguese footballer
- Antônio Gaspar (born 1931), Brazilian Roman Catholic bishop
- Boom Gaspar (born 1953), American musician
- Chuck Gaspar (1938–2009), American special effects artist
- Damien Gaspar (born 1975), Australian footballer
- Darren Gaspar (born 1976), Australian footballer
- Edu Gaspar (born 1978), Brazilian footballer
- Enrique Gaspar (1842–1902), Spanish playwright
- Hugo Gaspar (born 1982), Portuguese volleyball player
- José Gaspar (c.1756–1821), a mythical Spanish pirate also known as "Gasparilla"
- Robbie Gaspar (born 1981), former Australian footballer
- Roberto Luís Gaspar de Deus Severo (born 1976), Portuguese footballer known as Beto
- Rod Gaspar (born 1946), American baseball player
- Toni Gaspar (born 1973), Spanish politician
- Travis Gaspar (born 1981), Australian footballer

== In fiction ==
- Gaspar (Chrono Trigger), a character in the 1995 video game Chrono Trigger
- A Muppet character in Barrio Sésamo
- A controversial spell in the computer game series Zork that enables the player to resurrect themselves
- A fiery planet in the Ratchet & Clank video game series
- Gaspar, a character in the 2012 novel Unholy Night by Seth Grahame-Smith
- Gaspar de la Croix, a character in the video game Assassin's Creed
- The title character in Joseph Conrad's story Gaspar Ruiz, adapted for film as Gaspar the Strong Man
- Gaspar, a Haunter holding an Everstone sent over trade in Snowpoint City, in "Pokémon Diamond", Pokémon Pearl", "Pokémon Platinum", "Pokémon Brilliant Diamond", and "Pokémon Shining Pearl"
- Gaspar Peterson, a character in the 2019 horror novel Our Share of Night by Mariana Enríquez

== See also ==
- Gáspár, a Hungarian cognate
- Gašpar, a Slavic cognate
- Gașpar, a village in Moldova
- Gaspard (given name), a French cognate
- Gasparilla (disambiguation)
