= List of international prime ministerial trips made by Rob Jetten =

This is a list of international prime ministerial trips made by Rob Jetten, the current Prime Minister of the Netherlands.

== Summary of international trips ==
As of November 2026, Rob Jetten has made more than 13 prime ministerial trips to at least 11 states internationally since his inauguration on 23 February 2026. National trips are not included.

Prime Minister Rob Jetten's visits by country
| Number of visits | Country or Dutch overseas territory |
|---|---|
| 1 visit (13) | Aruba (Netherlands), Bonaire (Netherlands), Curaçao (Netherlands), Cyprus, Finland, Montenegro, Poland, Saba (Netherlands), Sint Eustatius (Netherlands), Sint Maarten (Netherlands), Turkey, Ukraine and the United Kingdom. |
| 2 visits (2) | France and the United States |
| 3 visits (1) | Germany |
| 4 visits (1) | Belgium |

== 2026 ==
| Country | Areas visited | Date(s) | Details | Image |
|---|---|---|---|---|
| Belgium | Brussels | 3 March | First foreign visit as Prime Minister. Met with President of the European Commission Ursula von der Leyen, President of the European Council António Costa and President of the European Parliament Roberta Metsola. | |
| Ukraine | Kyiv | 8 March | Met with Ukrainian President Volodymyr Zelenskyy. Commemorated fallen soldiers, discussed continued military and energy support, joint weapons production, and a clear path for Ukraine's EU accession. | |
| Poland | Warsaw | 9 March | Met with Prime Minister Donald Tusk. | |
| France | Paris | 11 March | He visited for talks with French President Emmanuel Macron and Prime Minister Sébastien Lecornu. Discussions focused on European security, support for Ukraine, energy policy, defence cooperation, and strengthening the competitiveness of the European Union. The leaders also exchanged views on transatlantic relations, economic resilience, climate and energy transition, and cooperation between the Netherlands and France within the European Union and NATO. | |
| Germany | Berlin | 16 March | For talks with German Chancellor Friedrich Merz. The leaders discussed European security, the conflict involving Iran, and the situation in the Strait of Hormuz, emphasizing the need for close coordination among European allies. Jetten and Merz also exchanged views on transatlantic relations and regional stability in the Middle East. The visit was intended to strengthen Dutch–German relations and included discussions on support for Ukraine and broader cooperation between the Netherlands and Germany. Both leaders expressed caution regarding proposals for an international naval escort mission in the Strait of Hormuz while stressing the importance of protecting freedom of navigation and avoiding further escalation. | |
| Belgium | Brussels | 19–20 March | Jetten attended the European Council. | |
| Finland | Helsinki | 26 March | Attended Joint Expeditionary Force summit. | |
| United States | Arlington, Washington, D.C. | 13–14 April | First stop in the US was Arlington on April 13, where Jetten visited Arlington National Cemetery for a public wreath-laying ceremony at the Tomb of the Unknown Soldier. On April 14, he attended a 90-minute private dinner with President Donald Trump at the White House alongside King Willem-Alexander and Queen Máxima. Met with bipartisan U.S. senators and former Secretary of State Mike Pompeo to discuss NATO security commitments and global conflicts. | |
| United Kingdom | London | 14 April | Met with British Prime Minister Keir Starmer at 10 Downing Street directly following the U.S. visit. Focused on bilateral energy security, migration, economic growth, and diplomatic escalation management in the Middle East. | |
| Cyprus | Nicosia | 23–24 April | Jetten attended an informal meeting of the European Council summit. | |
| Sint Maarten | Philipsburg | 10 May | Met with Prime Minister Luc Mercelina. | |
| Saba | The Bottom | 11 May | Met with Island Governor Jonathan G. A. Johnson. | |
| Sint Eustatius | Oranjestad | 11–12 May | Met with Island Governor Alida Francis. | |
| Bonaire | Kralendijk | 13 May | Met with Governor John Soliano. | |
| Aruba | Oranjestad | 13 May | Met with Prime Minister Mike Eman. They discussed the consequences of the geopolitical situation concerning Venezuela. | |
| Curaçao | Willemstad | 14 May | Met with Prime Minister Gilmar Pisas. | |
| Montenegro | Tivat | 5 June | Attended the EU–Western Balkans Summit. | |
| Belgium | Brussels | 18–19 June | Jetten attended the European Council. | |
| Turkey | Ankara | 7–8 July | Jetten attended the 2026 Ankara NATO summit. | |
| France | Paris | 13—14 July | Jetten travelled to Paris to attend a meeting with heads of state and government within the Coalition of the Willing. Jetten attended Bastille Day celebrations. | |
| United States | New York City | 21–26 September | Jetten attended to the 81th United Nations General Assembly and met with President of Ukraine Volodymyr Zelenskyy, President of Syria Ahmed al-Sharaa and King of Jordan Abdullah II. | |
| Germany | Münster | 1 October | Jetten visited the 1 German-Netherlands Corps together with German Chancellor Friedrich Merz and NATO Secretary General Mark Rutte. Jetten held a bilateral meeting with Merz to discuss German-Dutch cooperation, European and NATO affairs, migration, competitiveness, the future Multiannual Financial Framework of the European Union, support for Ukraine, defence and countering hybrid threats. He also met with military personnel and attended a joint press conference with Merz and Rutte. | |
| Belgium | Brussels | 15–16 October | Jetten attended the European Council. | |
| Germany | Berlin | 19 November | Jetten attended a meeting of the Coalition of the Willing. | |

== Future trips ==
| Country | Location | Date | Details |
|---|---|---|---|
| United States | Miami | 14–15 December | Jetten is scheduled to attend the G20 summit. |

== Multilateral meetings ==
Rob Jetten participated in the following summits during his premiership:

| Group | Year | | | |
| Group | 2026 | 2027 | 2028 | 2029 |
|---|---|---|---|---|
| UNGA | 21–26 September, (United States) New York City | TBD (United States) New York City | TBD (United States) New York City | TBD (United States) New York City |
| G20 | 14–15 December (United States) Miami | TBD; United Kingdom | TBD; South Korea | TBD; TBD |
| NATO | 7–8 July (Turkey) Ankara | TBD (Albania) Tirana | TBD | TBD |
| UNCCC | November (Turkey) Antalya | TBD (Ethiopia) Addis Ababa | TBD | TBD |
| JEF | 26 March (Finland) Helsinki | (Iceland) Reykjavík | TBD | TBD |
| EPC | 4 May,^{[a]} (Armenia) Yerevan | TBD (Switzerland) TBD | TBD (Azerbaijan) TBD | TBD |
| EPC | 12 November (Republic of Ireland) Dublin | TBD (Greece) TBD | TBD (Latvia) TBD | TBD (Netherlands) TBD |
| Others | Determined to act 13 July (France) Paris | | | |
██ = Future event ██ = Did not attend / participate.^aHe was attending the National Remembrance of the Dead (Dodenherdenking) ceremony at Dam Square in Amsterdam.

== See also ==
- Foreign relations of the Netherlands
- List of international prime ministerial trips made by Dick Schoof, his predecessor
