= Gaspard (name) =

Gaspard is a Francophone male given name or family name, and may refer to:

== People ==
=== Given name ===
- Gaspard II Schetz, Lord of Grobbendonk
- Gaspard Abeille (1648–1718), French poet
- Gaspard André (1840–1896), French architect
- Gaspard Augé (born 1979), one half of French electronic music duo Justice
- Claude Gaspard Bachet de Méziriac (1581–1638), French mathematician
- Gaspard Bauhin (1560–1624), Swiss botanist
- Gaspard Laurent Bayle (1774–1816), French physician
- Gaspard Bobek (1593–1635), Croatian Roman Catholic prelate
- Gaspard Auguste Brullé (1809–1873), French entomologist
- Gaspard Jean-Baptiste Brunet (1734–1793), French military commander
- Gaspard Bureau (died 1469), French ballistics expert and inventor
- Gaspard de Chabrol (1773–1843), French politician and government official
- Gaspard Adolphe Chatin (1813–1901), French physician, mycologist and botanist
- Pierre Gaspard Chaumette (1763–1794), French Revolutionary leader
- Gaspard I de Coligny (1465/1470–1522), French noble and military leader
- Gaspard II de Coligny (1519–1572), French Huguenot leader
- Gaspard III de Coligny (1584–1646), French Huguenot military general
- Gaspard Corrette (c. 1671 – c. 1733), French composer and organist
- Gaspard-Gustave de Coriolis (1792–1843), French mathematician
- Gaspard Cuenot (born 1991), Swiss Nordic skier and a former biathlete
- Gaspard Duchange (1662–1757), French engraver
- Gaspard Dughet (1613–1675), French painter
- Gaspard Fauteux (1898–1963), Canadian parliamentarian
- Gaspard Amédée Gardanne (1758–1807), French military general
- Gaspard Gourgaud (1783–1852), French military general
- Gaspard Goyrand (1803–1866), French surgeon and politician
- Gaspard de Gueidan (1688–1767), French aristocrat and lawyer
- Gaspard van der Heyden (c. 1496 – c. 1549), Dutch goldsmith, engraver, master printer and builder of astronomical instruments
- Gaspard Lemaire (1899–1979), Belgian swimmer
- Gaspard Thémistocle Lestiboudois (1797–1876), French naturalist
- Gaspard Louis, Haitian dancer and choreographer
- Gaspard Manesse (born 1975), French actor and musician
- Gaspard Marsy (1624/1625–1681), of the brothers Gaspard and Balthazard Marsy, French sculptor
- Gaspard Mermillod (1824–1892), Swiss Roman Catholic cardinal and bishop
- Gaspard Michaud (1795–1880), French malacologist
- Gaspard Théodore Mollien (1796–1872), French diplomat and explorer
- Gaspard Monge (1746–1818), French mathematician
- Gaspard Musabyimana (born 1955), Rwandan writer
- Gaspard Nemius (1587–1667), Roman Catholic bishop and archbishop
- Gaspard Pacaud (1859–1928), Canadian journalist and politician
- Gaspard de Prony (1755–1839), French mathematician and engineer
- Gaspard Rigaud (1661–1705), French painter and portraitist
- Gaspard Rinaldi (1909–1978), French cyclist
- Gaspard Robert (1722–1799), French ceramics manufacturer founder
- Gaspard Le Roux (c. 1670 – c. 1706), French harpsichordist
- Gaspard de Saulx (1509–1573), French military leader
- Gaspard Terrasson (1680–1752), French oratorian and priest
- Gaspard-Félix Tournachon (also known as Nadar; 1820–1910), French photographer known as (Félix) Nadar
- Gaspard Ulliel (1984–2022), French actor and model
- Gaspard Vieusseux (1746–1814), Swiss physician

=== Surname ===
- Mitch Gaspard (born 1965), American college baseball coach
- Patrick Gaspard (born 1967), president of the Center for American Progress (CAP)
- Pierre Gaspard (mountaineer) (1834–1915), French mountain climber and guide
- Pierre Gaspard (born 1959), Belgian physicist
- Shad Gaspard (1981–2020), American professional wrestler and actor

== Fictional characters ==
- Gaspard and Lisa, protagonists in a series of children's books by Anne Gutman and Georg Hallensleben
- A supporting character in Charles Dickens' novel, A Tale of Two Cities
- Grand Duke Gaspard de Chalons, a Dragon Age: Inquisition game character
- Gaspard, a character and boss in the videogame Dark Cloud 2

== See also ==
- Gaspard (disambiguation)
