= Gasparillo (disambiguation) =

Gasparillo may refer to:

- Gasparillo, Island of Trinidad, Trinidad and Tobago; a town
- Gasparillo Island, Trinidad and Tobago; an island
- Gasparillo station, a train station on the Trinidad Government Railway
- Gasparillo, another name for the flowering plant Esenbeckia (plant)

== See also ==
- Gasparillo / Bonne Aventure, a Trinidadian electoral district in Couva–Tabaquite–Talparo
- Gasparilla (disambiguation)
- Gaspar (disambiguation)
