= Gasparovic =

Gasparovic may refer to:

- Gašparovič, Slovak surname
- Gašparović, Croatian surname
