= Terrasson =

Terrasson may refer to:

People

- André Terrasson, French preacher
- Antoine Terrasson, 18th-century French erudite, nephew of Jean
- Gaspard Terrasson, French preacher, brother of André
- Jacky Terrasson, French-American pianist
- Jean Terrasson, 18th-century French writer

Places

- Beauregard-de-Terrasson, commune in the Dordogne department, France
- Terrasson-Lavilledieu, commune in the Dordogne department, France
