= Windward Antilles =

Island group in the Southeast Caribbean

Windward Islands Îles du Vent (French) Bovenwindse Eilanden (Dutch) Islanan riba di bientu (Papiamento) Islas de Barlovento (Spanish)
- Region
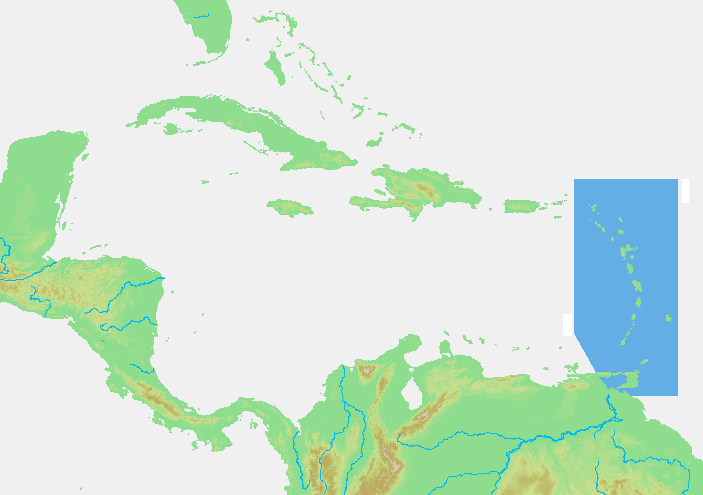
- Location within the Caribbean

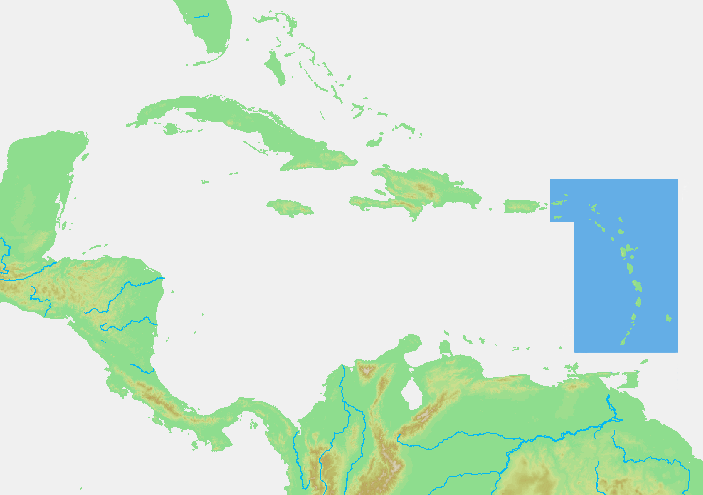
- Location within the Caribbean (excluding Trinidad and Tobago)
- Region: Caribbean
- Island States: 21: Trinidad and Tobago; Antigua and Barbuda; Barbados; British Virgin Islands (UK); Dominica; Grenada; Federal Dependencies of Venezuela (VE); Guadeloupe (FR); Martinique (FR); Montserrat (UK); Saba (NL); Saint Barthélemy (FR); Saint Kitts and Nevis; Saint Lucia; Saint Martin (FR); Saint Vincent and the Grenadines; Sint Eustatius (NL); Sint Maarten (NL); (Culebra, Puerto Rico) / (Vieques, Puerto Rico) Spanish Virgin Islands (PR); Anguilla (UK); United States Virgin Islands (US)

Area
  - Total: 12,000 km^{2} (4,600 sq mi)

Population
  - Total: 3,500,000
  - Density: 291.66/km^{2} (755.4/sq mi)
- Demonym: Windward Antillean
- Time zone: UTC-4 (AST)

The Windward Antilles are a group of islands part of the Lesser Antilles, forming a volcanic arc to the East of the Caribbean Sea, preferably subdivided in English into:

- The "Leeward Islands" (the northeastern subgroup), between the Virgin Islands and Dominica.
- The "Windward Islands" (the southeastern subgroup), between Martinique and Grenada, generally extended to Trinidad and Tobago.

== Terminological use ==
This term is almost completely absent in the English language. Although it is common in Spanish, French and Dutch, in English, it is sometimes used in reference to the Windward Antillean SSS Islands in contraposition to the Leeward Antillean ABC Islands in Dutch contexts. The table below provides a comparison across different local languages.

Language	Windward Antilles		Leeward Antilles
Spanish, French, Dutch and Papiamentu	Islas de Barlovento (Spanish) Îles du Vent (French), Bovenwindse eilanden (Dutch) and Islanan riba di bientu (Papiamentu).		Islas de Sotavento (Spanish) Îles Sous-le-Vent (French), Benedenwindse eilanden (Dutch) and Islanan bou di bientu (Papiamentu).
English	Windward Islands	Leeward Islands	Leeward Antilles

== Geographic distribution ==
Windward Antilles are the following (from north to south):

Country or dependency	Constituent Islands	Location
British Virgin Islands	Tortola Virgen Gorda Anegada Jost Van Dyke	
Spanish Virgin Islands (Puerto Rican municipalities)	Vieques Culebra	
US Virgin Islands	Saint Thomas Saint John Saint Croix Water Island	
Kingdom of the Netherlands and Caribbean Nederlands	Sint Eustatius (Statia); Saba; Dutch Sint Maarten	
French Overseas collectivities	French Saint-Martin; Saint-Barthelemy	
Anguilla (UK)		
Antigua and Barbuda	Antigua; Barbuda; Redonda	
Saint Kitts and Nevis	Saint Kitts; Nevis	
Montserrat (UK)		
Guadaloupe (French department)	Basse-Terre and Grande-Terre; Marie-Galante; La Désirade; Les Saintes; Petite-Terre	
Dominica		
Martinique (French department)		
Saint Lucia		
Barbados		
Saint Vincent and the Grenadines	Saint Vincent; Grenadines	
Grenada	Carriacou; Petite Martinique	
Trinidad and Tobago	Trinidad; Tobago; Chacachacare; Gaspar Grande; Gasparillo Island; Huevos Island; Monos; Little Tobago	
Venezuela	Aves Island; Patos Island; Los Testigos Islands	

== Political status ==
Thirteen countries claim sovereignty of the Windward Antilles. Eight of these are totally part of the islands (Trinidad and Tobago, Dominica, Saint Lucia, Saint Kitts and Nevis, Antigua and Barbuda, Saint Vincent and the Grenadines, Grenada and Barbados). The other five countries have most of their territory outside of the region (France, the USA, the Netherlands, the UK and Venezuela).

The Windward Antilles, part of the Lesser Antilles of the Caribbean Sea, have a surface of almost 12,000 km^{2} (4,600 sq mi) and more than two thirds belong to only two countries: Trinidad and Tobago (with 5,100 km^{2} (2,000 sq mi) totally part of the region) and France (2,800 km^{2} (1,100 sq mi) of French territory in the Antilles).

Country or dependency	Administration	Population	Language
Spanish Virgin Islands	Puerto Rican municipalities	11 499	Spanish
US Virgin Islands	Unincorporated territory of the U.S.A.	106 792	English
British Virgin Islands	Overseas territory of the UK.	28 054	English
Anguilla	Overseas territory of the UK.	14 764	English
Saint-Martin	Territorial collectivity of France.	35 742	French
Sint Maarten	Constituent country of the Netherlands	35 035	Dutch
Saint-Barthélemy	Territorial collectivity of France.	9 131	French
Saba	Municipality of the Netherlands.	1 991	Dutch
Saint Eustatius (Statia)	Municipality of the Netherlands.	3 193	Dutch
Saint Kitts and Nevis	Sovereign State	54 961	English
Antigua and Barbuda	Sovereign State	100 963	English
Montserrat	Overseas territory of the UK.	4 900	English
Guadeloupe	Overseas department of France.	402 119	French
Dominica	Sovereign State	73 543	English
Martinique	Overseas department of France.	385 551	French
Saint Lucia	Sovereign State	178 015	English
Saint Vincent and the Grenadines	Sovereign State	102 918	English
Grenada	Sovereign State	109 590	English
Barbados	Sovereign State	279 912	English
Trinidad and Tobago	Sovereign State	1 349 667	English
Venezuela	Federal Dependencies of Venezuela.	200 (aprox.)	Spanish

== Demography ==
Trinidad and Tobago (with almost 1.4 million people), plus the French territories (Guadaloupe, Martinique, Saint-Martin and Saint-Barthélemy, with almost 0.9 million people), represent almost two thirds of the Windward Antillean population from a total of 3.5 million people.

The local population mostly consists of Afrodescendants, racially mixed people from Indigenous peoples and descendants of centuries-old migrations, recent immigrants from other Antillean islands and a very small minority of European descendants.

=== Languages ===
English and French are the official and most spoken languages in the Windward Antilles.

Saint Martin island is the only one where both languages are the most prevalent ones but French is the only local official language due two the island being a territory of France (Slightly more than the northern half, part of the European Union) and the Kingdom of the Netherlands (southern half of the island), leaving Dutch as the official language of the Dutch side of the island.

Oostindie claims that on the Dutch Windward Antilles, the SSS Islands, English is the vernacular languages unlike on the Dutch Leeward Antilles, the ABC Islands, where Papiamentu is the vernacular, although all of these territories share Dutch as the official language. Sint Maarten stands out because Dutch is not even the second most spoken language due to Spanish-speaking and Haitian Creole-speaking immigrants.

Caribbean English and French-based creoles are the most spoken linguistic varieties in the region. Some Islands use English as the co-official language with Dutch, but the latter is scarcely used. Other common regional languages are Papiamentu and Spanish.

The indigenous languages of the islands became extinct. The languages spoken by Subsaharan Africans brought to the islands could not survive either. Although both groups left a substrate on both English and French-based creoles.

== See also ==
- Leeward Islands
- Windward Islands
- Leeward Antilles
- Antilles
- West Indies
