= Windward and leeward =

Position relative to wind direction: upwind and downwind respectively

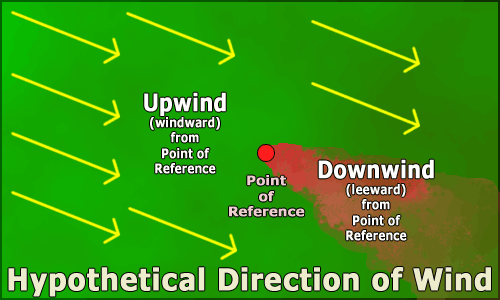
Diagram showing definitions of windward (upwind) and leeward (downwind)

In geography and seamanship, windward (/ˈwɪndwərd/ WIND-wərd, /ˈwɪnərd/ WIN-ərd) and leeward (/ˈliːwərd/ LEE-wərd, /ˈljuːərd/ LEW-ərd) are directions relative to the wind. Windward is upwind from the point of reference, i.e., facing the direction from which the wind is coming; leeward is downwind from the point of reference, i.e., along the direction towards which the wind is going.

The side of a ship that is towards the leeward is its "lee side". If the vessel is heeling under the pressure of crosswind, the lee side will be the "lower side". During the Age of Sail, the term weather was used as a synonym for windward in some contexts, as in the weather gage.

Since it captures rainfall, the windward side of a mountain tends to be wetter than the leeward side it blocks. The drier leeward area is said to be in a rain shadow.

== Origin ==
The term "windward" has roots in both Low German and Old English. The word "lee", which means a place without wind, comes from the Old Norse hle 'cover' and has been used in marine navigation in Germany since medieval times. The word "wind," meaning "air in motion," comes from Proto-Germanic *winda- and has evolved over time, with pronunciation changes influenced by similar words like "windy." The word "wind" has been associated with emptiness and vanity since the late 13th century. Additionally, "wind" has been used figuratively in phrases like "which way the wind blows" to indicate the current state of affairs. The suffix "-ward," meaning "toward," is an adverbial suffix in Old English derived from Proto-Germanic *werda-, which itself comes from the Proto-Indo-European root *wer- 'to turn, bend'. The original notion of "-ward" is "turned toward."

== Usage ==
Windward and leeward directions (and the points of sail they create) are important factors to consider in such wind-powered or wind-impacted activities as sailing, wind-surfing, gliding, hang-gliding, and parachuting. Other terms with broadly the same meaning are widely used, particularly upwind and downwind.

=== Nautical ===
Among sailing craft, the windward vessel is normally the more maneuverable. For this reason, rule 12 of the International Regulations for Preventing Collisions at Sea, applying to sailing vessels, stipulates that where two are sailing in similar directions in relation to the wind, the windward vessel gives way to the leeward vessel.

=== Naval warfare ===
In naval warfare during the Age of Sail, a vessel always sought to use the wind to its advantage, maneuvering if possible to attack from windward. This was particularly important for less maneuverable square-rigged warships, which had limited ability to sail upwind, and sought to "hold the weather gage" entering battle.

This was particularly important once artillery was introduced to naval warfare. Ships heel away from the wind, so the leeward vessel would expose more of its topsides to shot, in extreme cases even part of its bottom.

=== Describing islands ===
The terms windward and leeward are used in reference both to sides (and climates) of individual islands and relative island locations in an archipelago. The windward side of an island is subject to the prevailing wind, and is thus the wetter (see orographic precipitation). The leeward side is the side distant from or physically in the lee of the prevailing wind, and typically the drier.

In an archipelago windward islands are upwind and leeward islands are downwind of the prevailing winds, such as the trade winds of the Atlantic and Pacific oceans.

== See also ==
- Barlavento (windward) and Sotavento (leeward) in the Cape Verde Islands
- Downstream and upstream
- Foehn wind
- Lee shore
- List of nautical terms
- Northwestern Hawaiian Islands, also known as Leeward Islands
- Windward Islands, Leeward Islands, Windward Antilles and Leeward Antilles (in the Lesser Antilles)
- Windward Islands and Leeward Islands (in the Society Islands)
