= Gáspár =

- Gender: Male
- Name day: 27 August

Origin
- Region of origin: Hungary

Other names
- Related names: Gaspar, Gaspard

Gáspár is a Hungarian masculine given name, equivalent to English Jasper, and may refer to:

- Gáspár Bekes (1520–1579), Hungarian nobleman
- Gáspár Boldizsár (fl. 1990s), Hungarian sprint canoer
- Gáspár Borbás (1884–1976), Hungarian footballer
- Gáspár Csere (born 1991), Hungarian long distance and marathon runner
- Gáspár Heltai (c. 1490–1574), Transylvanian Saxon writer and printer
- Gáspár Károli (c. 1529–1591), Hungarian Calvinist pastor
- Gáspár Nagy (1949-2007), Hungarian poet and writer
- Gáspár Orbán (born 1992), Hungarian religious leader and footballer
- Gáspár Miklós Tamás (born 1948), Hungarian philosopher and intellectual
