= Evelina Betancourt-Anthony =

Bonairean health administrator and politician

- Born: Evelina Anthony; 1950 (age 75–76); Aruba
- Occupations: health care administrator, politician
- Years active: 1970–present

Evelina Betancourt-Anthony (born 1950) is an Aruban-born Bonairean health administrator and politician. From 1 December 2015 she served as acting Lieutenant Governor of the island for one year, filling the duties of Lieutenant Governor Edison Rijna in his absence.

== Early life ==
Evelina Anthony was born in 1950, in Aruba, where her father was working in the oil industry. Both of her parents were originally from Bonaire, as were her grandparents. When her father was laid off from the refinery, the entire family returned to Bonaire, where they still had a house. After her primary schooling, she attended Meer Uitgebreid Lager Onderwijs (MULO) for two years in Bonaire and in 1968 moved to the Netherlands to finish her secondary education. She attended Schoevers, in Amsterdam studying management and organization, but didn't have the money to pay for further schooling. Instead, she entered nursing where she could train, room and board were provided, and she received a small monthly stipend. She began her training at the hospital in Amsterdam-Noord, but stopped before she finished her training to take full- time employment at the Argentinean State Shipping Company in Amsterdam to allow her fiancé to finish his education.

== Career ==
She had two children and did volunteer work. Anthony went to school, taking law courses at the University of the Netherlands Antilles in Curaçao. After two years, she was offered a position in the administrative department at a health clinic in Nort Saliña. After two years, she took a government post in 1990 as a health project coordinator for the entire Netherlands Antilles, which required a lot of travel to various islands. In 1996, Anthony also became involved with the Association for Nursing and Care for the Elderly (Dutch: Stichting Ziekenverpleging & Bejaardenzorg) being elected as chair of the association a few months after her first meeting with the board.

In 1999, Anthony decided to enter politics and when her party won the elections, she was appointed as Deputy over Health Care. It was a time of change on the island, as before the police had operated the ambulance service and most major care required that patients be sent via boat to Curaçao. A supervisory board was established to take over the ambulance service, and home health care, and provide training for health workers. In 2000, Anthony was appointed as a Minister in the government at The Hague and returned to the Netherlands for two years. She returned to Bonaire and resumed the chair of the association, which had been renamed as the Mariadal Foundation (Dutch: Fundashon Mariadal). Under the new system, the chair was a rotating position on the board, and Anthony served at the facility until 2014.

On 1 December 2015, Anthony was appointed as the temporary acting Island Governor for Bonaire and the Kingdom of the Netherlands representative for Bonaire, Saba and Sint Eustatius for a period of one year, serving in his stead when Lieutenant Governor Edison Rijna was away from the island. After that timeframe, her title was changed to Deputy Lieutenant Governor.
