= Scorpion Island =

Scorpion Island may refer to:

- Scorpion Island, an island belonging to the nation of St. Lucia.
- Scorpion Island, an alternative name for Gasparillo Island, an islet in the Republic of Trinidad and Tobago.
- Escape from Scorpion Island, a children's game show produced by the BBC in the United Kingdom.
