= List of international prime ministerial trips made by Dick Schoof =

This is a list of international prime ministerial trips made by Dick Schoof, who was the Prime Minister of the Netherlands from July 2024 to February 2026.

== Summary of international trips ==
Dick Schoof has made more than ten prime ministerial trips to at least eight states internationally since his inauguration on 2 July 2024. National trips are not included.

Prime Minister Dick Schoof's visits by country
Number of visits	Country or Dutch overseas territory
1 visit (16)	Albania, Bonaire (Netherlands), Brazil, Colombia, Denmark, Egypt, Estonia, Hungary, Japan, Lithuania, Saba (Netherlands), Sint Eustatius (Netherlands), Sint Maarten (Netherlands), South Africa, Switzerland
2 Visits (6)	Aruba (Netherlands), Curaçao (Netherlands), Germany, Luxembourg, Poland, Vatican City
3 visits (3)	Ukraine, United States
4 visits (1)	United Kingdom
5 visits (1)	France
8 visits (1)	Belgium

== 2024 ==
Country	Areas visited	Date(s)	Details	Image
Belgium	Brussels	8 July	Newly appointed prime minister Dick Schoof goes to Brussels for an introduction. Among others, he meets with the president of the European Commission Ursula von der Leyen.	
United States	Washington D.C.	9–11 July	Schoof attends the 2024 NATO summit in Washington, D.C., hosted by President Joe Biden, to commemorate the landmark 75th anniversary of NATO and to participate in the North Atlantic Council (NAC) meeting.	
Belgium	Brussels	15 July	Schoof meets Belgian prime minister Alexander De Croo for an introductory visit.	
Luxembourg	Luxembourg City	15 July	Schoof meets Luxembourgish prime minister Luc Frieden for an introductory visit.	
United Kingdom	Woodstock	18 July	Schoof attends the 4th European Political Community Summit.	
France	Paris	26–27 July	Schoof attends the 2024 Summer Olympics	
Ukraine	Zaporizhzhia	2 September	Announced a new aid package for Kyiv worth over €200 million.	
United States	New York City	24–27 September	Attended General debate of the seventy-ninth session of the United Nations General Assembly.	
Hungary	Budapest	7–8 November	Schoof attends the 5th European Political Community Summit in Budapest.	
Estonia	Tallinn	16 December	Schoof attends the 2024 Joint Expeditionary Force summit.	
Belgium	Brussels	18 December	Schoof attends the 2024 EU-Western Balkans summit.	
Lithuania	Rukla	24 December	Visited Dutch troops stationed there for NATO's Enhanced Forward Presence. Held bilateral discussions with Lithuanian PM Gintautas Paluckas on collective defence and deterrence.	

== 2025 ==
Country	Areas visited	Date(s)	Details	Image
Switzerland	Davos	21–22 January	Schoof attends the World Economic Forum Annual Meeting 2025.	
Poland	Oświęcim	27 January	Schoof attended the commemoration of the 80th anniversary of the liberation of the Auschwitz concentration camp.	
United Kingdom	London	6 February	Meeting with Prime Minister Keir Starmer to discuss security and cooperation.	
Ukraine	Kyiv	15 February	Meeting with President Volodymyr Zelenskyy; discussion of support for Ukraine.	
France	Paris	17 February	Schoof joined an Emergency meeting of European leaders, hosted by President Macron, to respond to President Trump's push for peace negotiations to end the Russo-Ukrainian War.	
United Kingdom	London	2 March	Schoof travelled to London, United Kingdom to attend the Summit on Ukraine and met with Prime Minister Keir Starmer and King Charles III.	
Belgium	Brussels	20–21 March	Schoof attended a European Council summit.	
France	Paris	27 March	Schoof attended a meeting of the "Coalition of the willing" hosted by President Macron.	
Japan	Tokyo	21 April	Met with Prime Minister Shigeru Ishiba in Tokyo to discuss strengthening bilateral relations between Japan and the Netherlands in areas including security, economic security, trade, high technology, energy, and life sciences. The leaders announced the "Japan–Netherlands Action Plan 2025" and highlighted cooperation linked to Expo 2025 Osaka. The talks also focused on regional and global security issues, including Russia's invasion of Ukraine, military cooperation between Russia and North Korea, and developments in East Asia. Both sides emphasized continued cooperation on Indo-Pacific and Euro-Atlantic security and reaffirmed support for a rules-based international order.	
Vatican City	Vatican City	26 April	Schoof attended the funeral of Pope Francis.	
Norway	Oslo	9 May	Attended Joint Expeditionary Force summit.	
Bonaire	Kralendijk	10 May	Schoof visits the Caribbean part of the Kingdom of the Netherlands.	
Aruba	Oranjestad	11 May	Schoof visits the Caribbean part of the Kingdom of the Netherlands. Met with Prime Minister Mike Eman.	
Curaçao	Willemstad	12 May	Schoof visits the Caribbean part of the Kingdom of the Netherlands. Met with Prime Minister Gilmar Pisas.	
Saba	The Bottom	13 May	Schoof visits the Caribbean part of the Kingdom of the Netherlands.	
Sint Eustatius	Oranjestad	14 May	Schoof visits the Caribbean part of the Kingdom of the Netherlands.	
Sint Maarten	Philipsburg	15 May	Schoof visits the Caribbean part of the Kingdom of the Netherlands.	
Albania	Tirana	16 May	6th European Political Community Summit	
Vatican City	Vatican City	18 May	Attended the inauguration mass of Pope Leo XIV.	
Belgium	Brussels	21 May	Travelled to Brussels to meet with Secretary General of NATO Mark Rutte in NATO Headquarters. They discussed the boosting defence spending, support for Ukraine and the upcoming NATO Summit in The Hague.	
Germany	Berlin	10 June	Met with Chancellor Friedrich Merz.	
Belgium	Brussels	26–27 June	Schoof attended the European Council meeting.	
Poland	Warsaw	7 July	Schoof met with Prime Minister Donald Tusk to discuss strengthening the strategic partnership between the Netherlands and Poland. The talks focused on European and transatlantic security, support for Ukraine, defence cooperation, and economic competitiveness within the European Union. The leaders also discussed cooperation in defence, semiconductors, artificial intelligence, energy, and innovation. During the visit, both sides reaffirmed their commitment to closer bilateral cooperation and welcomed further collaboration on security, critical infrastructure protection, and economic resilience.	
Italy	Rome	10–11 July	Attended Ukraine Recovery Conference.	
France	Paris	4 September	Met with President Emmanuel Macron. Attended the 7th Coalition of the willing summit.	
Luxembourg	Luxembourg City	10 September	Schoof attended the Benelux Summit.	
United States	New York City	25 September	Attended the General debate of the eightieth session of the United Nations General Assembly. Met with President of Syria Ahmed al-Sharaa.	
Denmark	Copenhagen	2 October	Attended the 7th European Political Community Summit.	
Ukraine	Kyiv	6 October	Met with President Volodymyr Zelenskyy. During the meeting, the leaders discussed strengthening sanctions against Russia. The President emphasized that Ukraine expects the adoption of the European Union's 19th sanctions package and continued pressure on Russia's war machine.	
Egypt	Sharm El Sheikh	13 October	Schoof attended the Sharm El Sheikh summit which included the signing of the Gaza peace plan to end the Gaza war.	
Belgium	Brussels	22–24 October	Attended the 252nd European Council summit.	
United Kingdom	London	24 October	Attended the 8th Coalition of the willing meeting.	
Brazil	Belém	6–7 November	Schoof attended the COP30 pre-conference.	
Curaçao	Willemstad	8 November	Schoof visits the Caribbean part of the Kingdom of the Netherlands. Met with Prime Minister Gilmar Pisas and Governor Mauritsz de Kort.	
Aruba	Oranjestad	8 November	Schoof visits the Caribbean part of the Kingdom of the Netherlands. Met with Prime Minister Mike Eman and Governor Alfonso Boekhoudt.	
Colombia	Santa Marta	9 November	Schoof attended the EU-CELAC summit.	
South Africa	Johannesburg	22–23 November	Schoof attended the 2025 G20 Johannesburg summit.	
Germany	Berlin	14–15 December	Attended a meeting with US envoys Steve Witkoff and Jared Kushner along with Chancellor Friedrich Merz, President of Ukraine Volodymyr Zelenskyy, Prime Minister of Norway Jonas Gahr Støre, Prime Minister of Denmark Mette Frederiksen, Prime Minister of Sweden Ulf Kristersson, President of France Emmanuel Macron, President of Finland Alexander Stubb, Prime Minister Donald Tusk, Prime Minister of the United Kingdom Keir Starmer, Prime Minister of Italy Giorgia Meloni, Secretary General of NATO Mark Rutte, President of the European Commission Ursula von der Leyen and President of the European Council António Costa to discuss the Trump peace plan.	

== 2026 ==
Country	Areas visited	Date(s)	Details	Image
France	Paris	6 January	Schoof attended the Coalition of the Willing meeting in Paris with fellow leaders.	
Switzerland	Davos	20-22 January	Schoof attended the 2026 World Economic Forum annual meeting.	
Germany	Hamburg	26 January	Schoof attended the 2026 North Sea Summit.	
Italy	Milan	6-7 February	Schoof attended the opening ceremony of the 2026 Winter Olympics, and visited the Olympic Village.	
Belgium	Antwerp, Rijkhoven	11-12 February	Schoof attended the 3rd European Industry Summit. Next day he participated in the informal meeting of EU heads of state and government.	
Germany	Munich	13-14 February	Schoof attended the 62nd Munich Security Conference.	
India	New Delhi	18-20 February	Schoof attended the India AI Impact Summit 2026.	

== Multilateral meetings ==
Dick Schoof participated in the following summits during his premiership:

Group	Year		
Group	2024	2025	2026
UNGA	24–27 September, (United States) New York City	25 September, (United States) New York City	
G20	Not a G20 Member	22–23 November, (South Africa) Johannesburg	
NATO	9–11 July, (United States) Washington, D.C.	24–26 June, (Netherlands) The Hague	
Ukraine Recovery Conference		10–11 July, (Italy) Rome	
EPC	18 July, (United Kingdom) Woodstock	16 May, (Albania) Tirana	
EPC	7 November, (Hungary) Budapest	2 October, (Denmark) Copenhagen	
EU–CELAC	None	9 November, (Colombia) Santa Marta	None
COP	12 November,^{[a]} (Azerbaijan) Baku	6–7 November, (Brazil) Belém	
JEF	16–17 December, (Estonia) Tallinn	9 May, (Norway) Oslo	
North Sea Summit	None		26 January, (Germany) Hamburg
Others	None	Securing our future 2 March, (United Kingdom) London	Together for peace and security summit 6 January, (France) Paris
Others	None	15 March, (videoconference); United Kingdom	Together for peace and security summit 6 January, (France) Paris
Others	None	Building a robust peace for Ukraine and Europe; 27 March, (France) Paris	Together for peace and security summit 6 January, (France) Paris
██ = Did not attend.^aSchoof cancelled his attendance of the 2024 UNCCC to monitor the Dutch government's response.

== See also ==
- Foreign relations of the Netherlands
- List of international prime ministerial trips made by Mark Rutte, his predecessor
- List of international prime ministerial trips made by Rob Jetten, his successor
