= Public body (Netherlands) =

Generic Dutch term for administrative divisions

In the Netherlands, the term public body (a literal translation from the Dutch term openbaar lichaam) is the general denomination for administrative divisions within the Dutch state, such as the central government, a province, a municipality or a water board. These types of political entities are defined by the Constitution of the Netherlands.

In addition, Article 134 of the constitution provides for the definition of other public bodies by law. Such bodies can be professionally oriented, like the Dutch Order of Advocates (Dutch: Nederlandse Orde van Advocaten), or be constituted to perform functions in a specific region. This means that the term public body is sometimes used to indicate a special or irregular type of public body (without a specifically defined name), which can also be an administrative division or a certain other type of governmental organisation.

== Caribbean Netherlands ==
After the dissolution of the Netherlands Antilles on October 10, 2010, the three islands of Bonaire, Sint Eustatius, and Saba became public bodies of the Netherlands. They are not part of any province. Since 2017, they are public bodies of a special constitutional category, Caribbean public bodies. Collectively, they are officially known as Caribbean Netherlands (Dutch: Caribisch Nederland). Although part of the Netherlands, these special municipalities (as they are also called) remained overseas territories of the European Union until 2015.

In the absence of a King's Commissioner the Islands have a joint "Kingdom Representative" (Dutch: Rijksvertegenwoordiger voor de openbare lichamen Bonaire, Sint Eustatius en Saba), who has an office on each of the islands. As of 2018, the incumbent Kingdom Representative was Jan Helmond.

Flag	Arms	Special municipality	Capital	Lieutenant Governor	Area(km^{2})	Population	Density (per km^{2})
Flag of Bonaire	Coat of arms of Bonaire	Bonaire (Papiamento: Boneiru)	Kralendijk	Edison Rijna	294	15,414	52
Flag of Sint Eustatius	Coat of arms of Sint Eustatius	Sint Eustatius (Locally: Statia)	Oranjestad	Alida Francis	21	3,300	157
Flag of Saba	Coat of arms of Saba	Saba	The Bottom	Jonathan Johnson	13	2,000	154

== Other examples ==
Another notable example of an administrative division merely denoted as "public body" is Rijnmond (Dutch: openbaar lichaam Rijnmond), which existed from 1964 to 1986. Also, before the establishment of the Province of Flevoland, the newly reclaimed polders were under the jurisdiction of the "Public Body Southern IJsselmeerpolders" (Openbaar Lichaam Zuidelijke IJsselmeerpolders, also abbreviated as OL ZIJP).

On a regional level, municipalities, provinces, water boards and the Caribbean public bodies can constitute internal or umbrella public bodies, as defined by the law on common arrangements (Dutch: wet gemeenschappelijke regelingen). Examples of such bodies include:

- Plus regions/city regions (Dutch: Plusregio's/stadsregio's): Organisations of urbanised regions, e.g. the plus regions "Samenwerkingsverband Regio Eindhoven", "Parkstad Limburg".
- Safety regions (Dutch: veiligheidsregio's): Organisations coordinating disaster management, fire fighting etc.
- Social services organisations covering several municipalities.

== See also ==
- Administrative division
- Statutory corporation
- Sui generis – a common law idea that is analogous to parts of this concept
