= Public body (disambiguation) =

A public body is commonly a statutory corporation created by a state.

“Public body” may also refer to:

- Administrative division or public body, a political division of a country
  - Public body (Netherlands)
- Scottish public bodies

== See also ==
- Non-departmental public body
