= Lydia Emerencia =

Aruban island governor

Island Governor of Bonaire
- In office 1 March 2012 – 1 March 2014
- Monarchs: Beatrix; Willem-Alexander
- Preceded by: Glenn Thodé
- Succeeded by: Edison Rijna

Personal details
- Born: 1954 (age 71–72)
- Education: University of Utrecht; Katholieke Universiteit Nijmegen

Lydia A. Emerencia (born 1954 in Aruba) was Island Governor of Bonaire from 1 March 2012 to 1 March 2014.

Emerencia received a PhD at the University of Utrecht and a PhD from the Katholieke Universiteit Nijmegen. Prior to becoming Island Governor of Bonaire, she was a faculty member of the University of Aruba.
