= List of lighthouses in Sint Eustatius =

This is a list of lighthouses in Sint Eustatius.

== Lighthouses ==
Name	Image	Year built	Location & coordinates	Class of Light	Focal height	NGA number	Admiralty number	Range nml
Oranjestad Lighthouse	Image	1893 est.	Oranjestad; 17°29′01.7″N 62°59′13.1″W	Fl (3) W 15s.	20 metres (66 ft)	14742	J5668.5	17

== See also ==
- Lists of lighthouses and lightvessels
