= Sydney A. E. Sorton =

Saba politician (born 1947)

Sydney Sorton
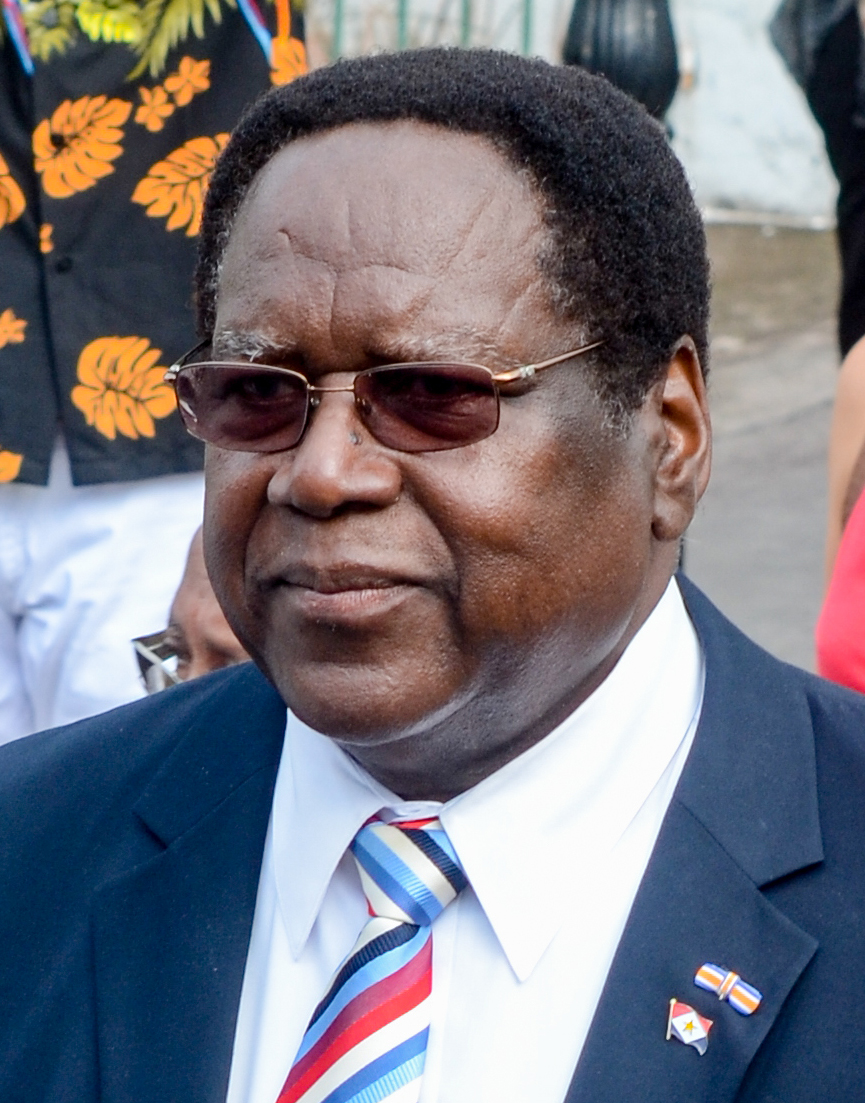

Lieutenant Governor of Saba
- In office 2 November 1989 – 19 November 1998
- Monarch: Beatrix
- Preceded by: Wycliffe Smith
- Succeeded by: Will Johnson (acting); Antoine Solagnier
- In office 1 April 2006 – 2 July 2008
- Preceded by: Antoine Solagnier
- Succeeded by: Jonathan Johnson

Personal details
- Born: 2 July 1947 (age 78)
- Occupation: Politician

Sydney Alton Eugene Sorton (born 2 July 1947) is a politician from Saba, who currently holds the office of acting-judge with the Joint Court of Justice. Before this, Sorton was the lieutenant governor of Saba on two occasions, serving from 2 November 1989 to 19 November 1998 and from 1 April 2006 to 2 July 2008. Prior to that, Sorton was a law enforcement civil servant for the Netherlands Antilles Police Force.
