= Gasparilla =

Gasparilla may refer to:

- Gasparilla Pirate Festival, a large parade and related events held annually in Tampa, Florida
- José Gaspar, also known as Gasparilla, a Spanish pirate from Florida folklore for whom the festival is named
- Gasparilla Bowl, a college football post-season game played in Tampa, Florida
- Gasparilla Island, an island near the mouth of Charlotte Harbor in southwest Florida

== See also ==
- Gasparillo (disambiguation)
- Gaspar (disambiguation)
