= Gašparović =

Gašparović is a Croatian and Serbian surname.

In Croatia, they are mostly from the environs of Novi Vinodolski, and it is the most common surname in Modruš, but today it is chiefly found in Zagreb, followed by Štitar, Crikvenica, Sukošan and Rijeka. Many of its members have emigrated to Australia, the United States, Germany and other countries.

Notable people with the name include:

- Đuro Gašparović (1951–), bishop emeritus of the Roman Catholic Diocese of Srijem
- Jadranka Gašparović, Croatian cellist, recipient of the Milka Trnina Award in 1994
- Ljubomir Gašparović, Croatian pianist, recipient of the Milka Trnina Award in 1995

== See also ==
- Gašparovič, Slovak surname
- Gašpar

== Bibliography ==
- Moj.hr (n.d.). "Prezime Gašparović". Acta Croatica (in Croatian).
