= Jonathan G. A. Johnson =

Island Governor of Saba since 2008 (born 1976)

His Excellency Mr. Jonathan Johnson
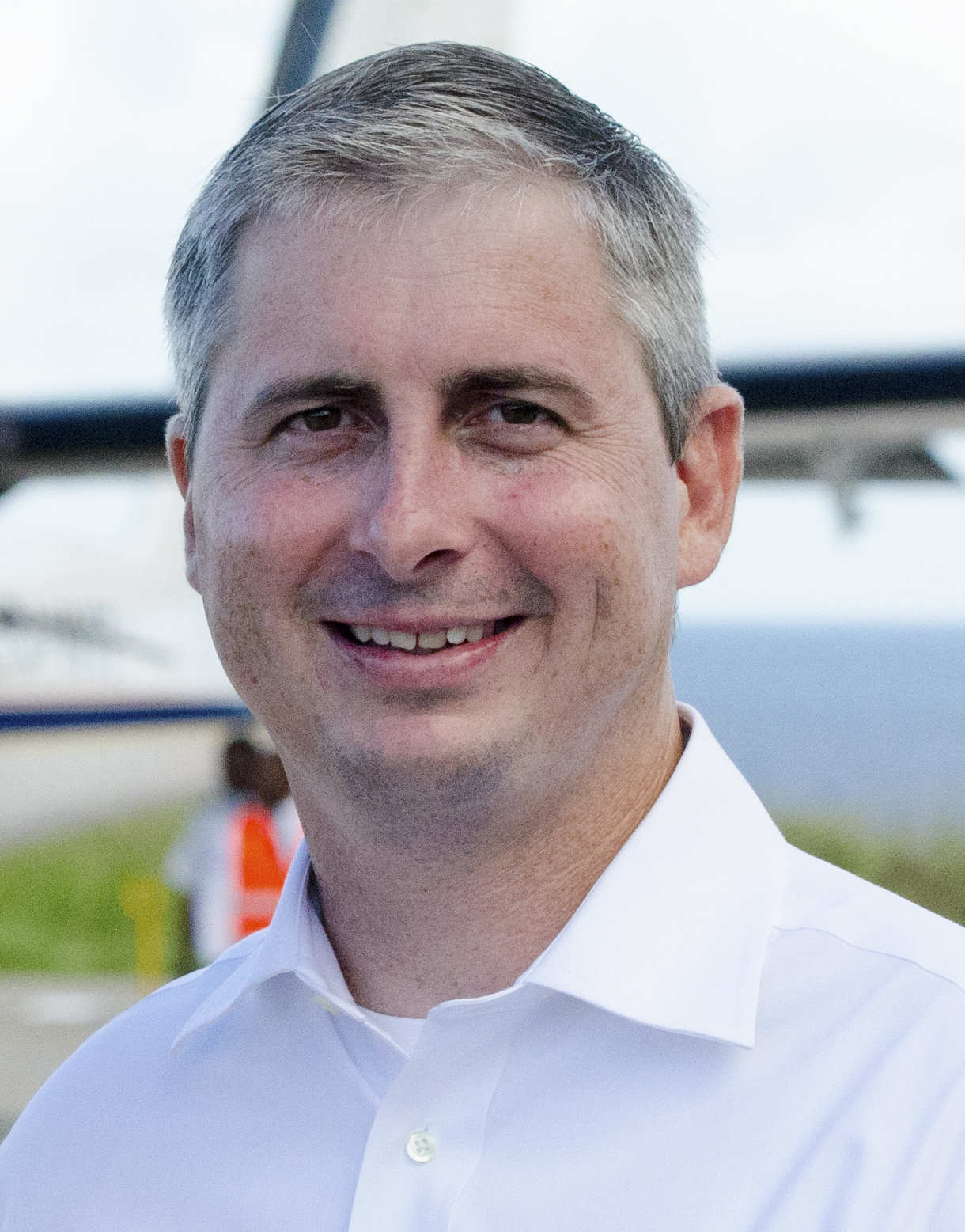

Island Governor of Saba
- In office 2 July 2008 – 30 June 2026
- Monarchs: Beatrix; Willem-Alexander
- Preceded by: Sydney Sorton
- Succeeded by: Jocelyn Levenstone

Personal details
- Born: 25 September 1976 (age 50) Saba, Netherlands Antilles
- Spouse: Rosalyn Johnson
- Education: University of Florida

Jonathan G.A. Johnson (born 25 September 1976) has been the island governor of Saba since 2008.

== Biography ==
Johnson was born on 25 September 1976 on Saba. He is the third and youngest child of Guy and Angela Johnson. He attended Saba Comprehensive School in Saba. He studied in the United States, graduating from the University of Florida with a master's degree in education in 1999.

Before becoming Island Governor, he taught at the Sacred Heart Elementary School for four years. In 2004, Johnson became the director of the Saba Comprehensive School and held that position until 2008.

Johnson began his first term as island governor on 2 July 2008. He was sworn in for his second term on 1 July 2014. In 2020, Johnson was appointed for a third term.

Johnson has been married to Rosalyn Hassell since 2012, the couple have three children.

== See also ==
- Gerald Berkel, former island governor of Sint Eustatius (2010–2016)
- Marnix van Rij, island governor of Sint Eustatius (2020–)
- Edison Rijna, former island governor of Bonaire (2014–2023)
- Sydney A. E. Sorton, former island governor of Saba (1989–1998 and 2006–2008)
