= List of heads of government of Saba =

The island governor of Saba is the representative on Saba, an island of the Netherlands, of the Dutch head of state (King Willem-Alexander), under responsibility of the minister of the interior and kingdom relations. The governor is appointed by the monarch for a period of six years. The island governor chairs the meetings of the Executive Council and the Island Council, and is the head of the public entity. The current island governor is Jonathan Johnson. The acting island governor is Shamara Nicholson-Linzey.

== Functions ==
According to the Wolbes the powers of the island governor are:

=== Section 172 ===
1. The Island Governor will see to:
  1. timely preparation, adoption and implementation of the policy of the public entity and of the resulting decisions, as well as proper attuning between those involved in such preparation, adoption and implementation;
  2. proper cooperation of the public entity with the other public entities and other governments;
  3. the quality of procedures in the area of citizen participation;
  4. careful handling of notices of objection;
  5. careful handling of complaints by the island government.
  6. The Island Governor will otherwise promote proper attendance to the affairs of the public entity.

=== Section 173 ===
1. The Island Governor will represent the public entity in and out of court.
2. The Island Governor may delegate the representation to a person appointed by him.

=== Section 174 ===
1. The Island Governor will be entrusted with maintaining public order.

== List ==
Denotes service as acting head of government prior to appointment or after resignation

=== Island Territory of the Windward Islands ===
Until 1 April 1983 Saba coexisted with St. Eustatius and Sint Maarten under the Island Territory of the Windward Islands. The lieutenant governor of this island territory was represented on Saba by an administrator.

No.	Name	Tenure	
No.	Name	Took office	Left office
1	Pieter Dijkstra	1951	1952
–	L. de Hoop (acting)	1952	1952
2	Ludwig Reginald Carty	1952	1955
3	Walter Granville Buncamper	1955	1958
4	Edward Carl Labega	1958	1960
5	Henry Carlyle Every	1960	1962
–	Reinier O. van Delden (acting)	1962	1962
6	Louis Meindert Overberg	1962	1964
–	Reinier O. van Delden (acting)	1964	1964
7	Gerardus van de Wal	1964	1969
8	Joseph E. Richardson	1969	1971
–	John Arthur Anslijn (acting)	1971	1971
9	Eugenius A. Johnson	1971	1973
10	Laurens Rosema	1973	1973
11	Victor R. Abraham	1973	1974
–	John Godfrey Woods (acting)	1974	1975
12	George R. Sleeswijk	1975	1977
–	William S. Johnson (acting)	1977	1977
–	Eugenius A. Johnson (acting)	1977	1977
–	William S. Johnson (acting)	1977	1978
13	Thadeus G. Larmonie	1978	1981
–	George R. Sleeswijk (acting)	1981	1981
14	Raphael Sorton	1981	1983

=== Island Territory of Saba ===
No.	Portrait	Name	Tenure	
No.	Portrait	Name	Took office	Left office
–		Raphael Sorton (acting)	1 April 1983	1 November 1983
1		Wycliffe Smith	1 November 1983	2 November 1989
2		Sydney Sorton	2 November 1989	19 November 1998
–		William S. Johnson (acting)	1998	1 May 1999
3		Antoine Solagnier	1 May 1999	1 April 2006
4		Sydney Sorton	1 April 2006	2 July 2008
5		Jonathan Johnson	2 July 2008	10 October 2010

=== Public Entity Saba ===
No.	Portrait	Name	Tenure	
No.	Portrait	Name	Took office	Left office
1		Jonathan Johnson	10 October 2010	30 June 2026
2		Jocelyn R. Levenstone	9 July 2026	Incumbent
