= Gašparovič =

Gašparovič is a Slovak surname.

Notable people with the name include:

- Ivan Gašparovič (1941–), the third President of Slovakia
- Lukáš Gašparovič (1993–), professional footballer
- Silvia Gašparovičová (1941–), former First lady of Slovakia

== See also ==
- Gašparović, Croatian and Serbian surname
- Martina Gasparovič Bezoušková (1961–), Czech theatre and film actress
- Gašpar
