= Leeward Antilles =

Island group in the Caribbean

Coordinates: 12°11′10″N 68°59′22″W

Location of Leeward Antilles within Caribbean (light purple shading)

The Leeward Antilles (Dutch: Benedenwindse Eilanden; Spanish: islas de Sotavento; Papiamento: Islanan Abou) are a chain of islands in the Caribbean, specifically part of the southerly islands of the Lesser Antilles (and, in turn, the Antilles and the West Indies) along the southeastern fringe of the Caribbean Sea, just north of the Venezuelan coast of the South American mainland. The Leeward Antilles, while among the Lesser Antilles, are not to be confused with the Leeward Islands (also of the Lesser Antilles) to the northeast.

Largely lacking in volcanic activity, the Leeward Antilles island arc occurs along the deformed southern edge of the Caribbean Plate and was formed by the plate's subduction under the South American Plate. Recent studies indicate that the Leeward Antilles are accreting to South America.

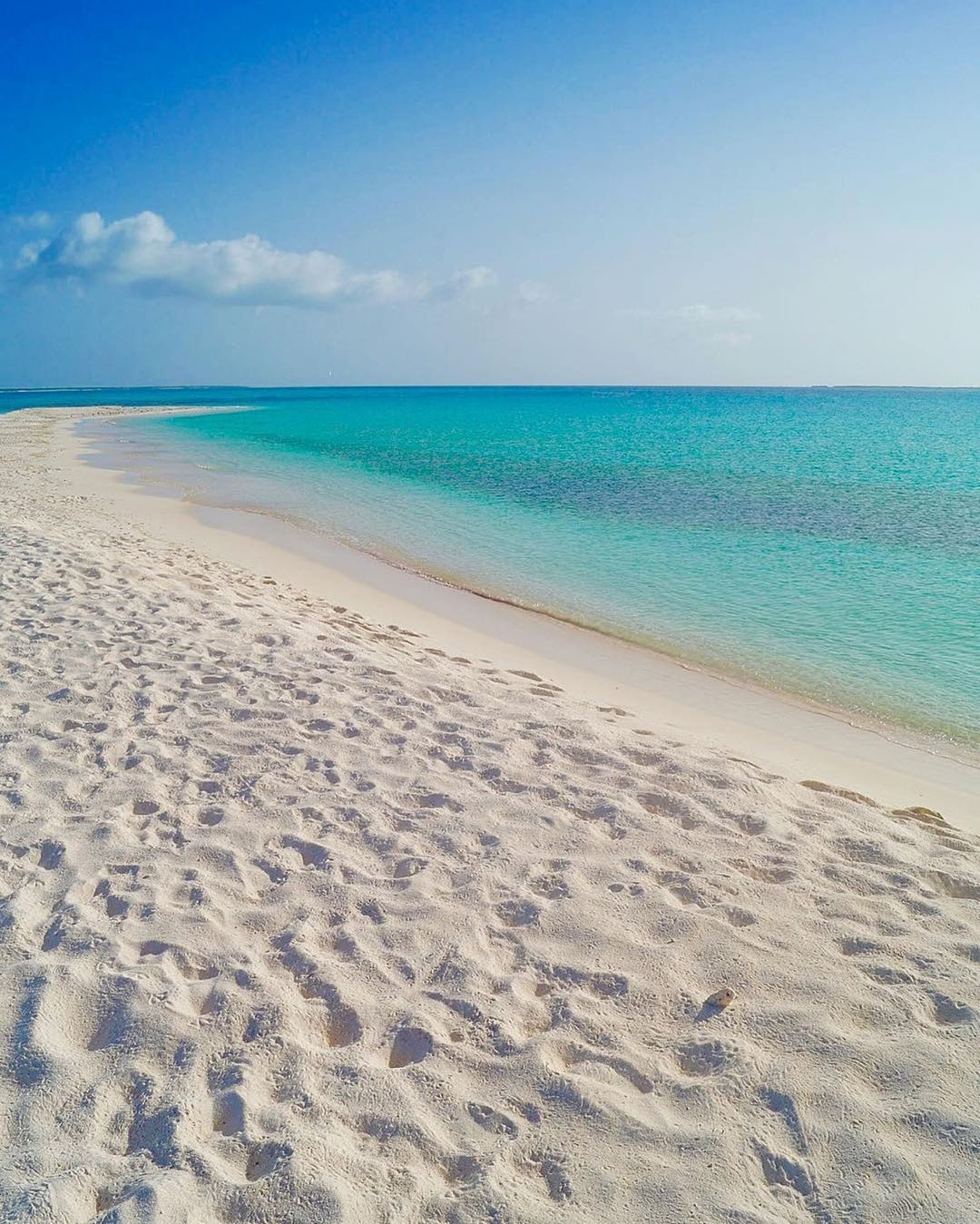
La Tortuga Island, Federal Dependencies of Venezuela

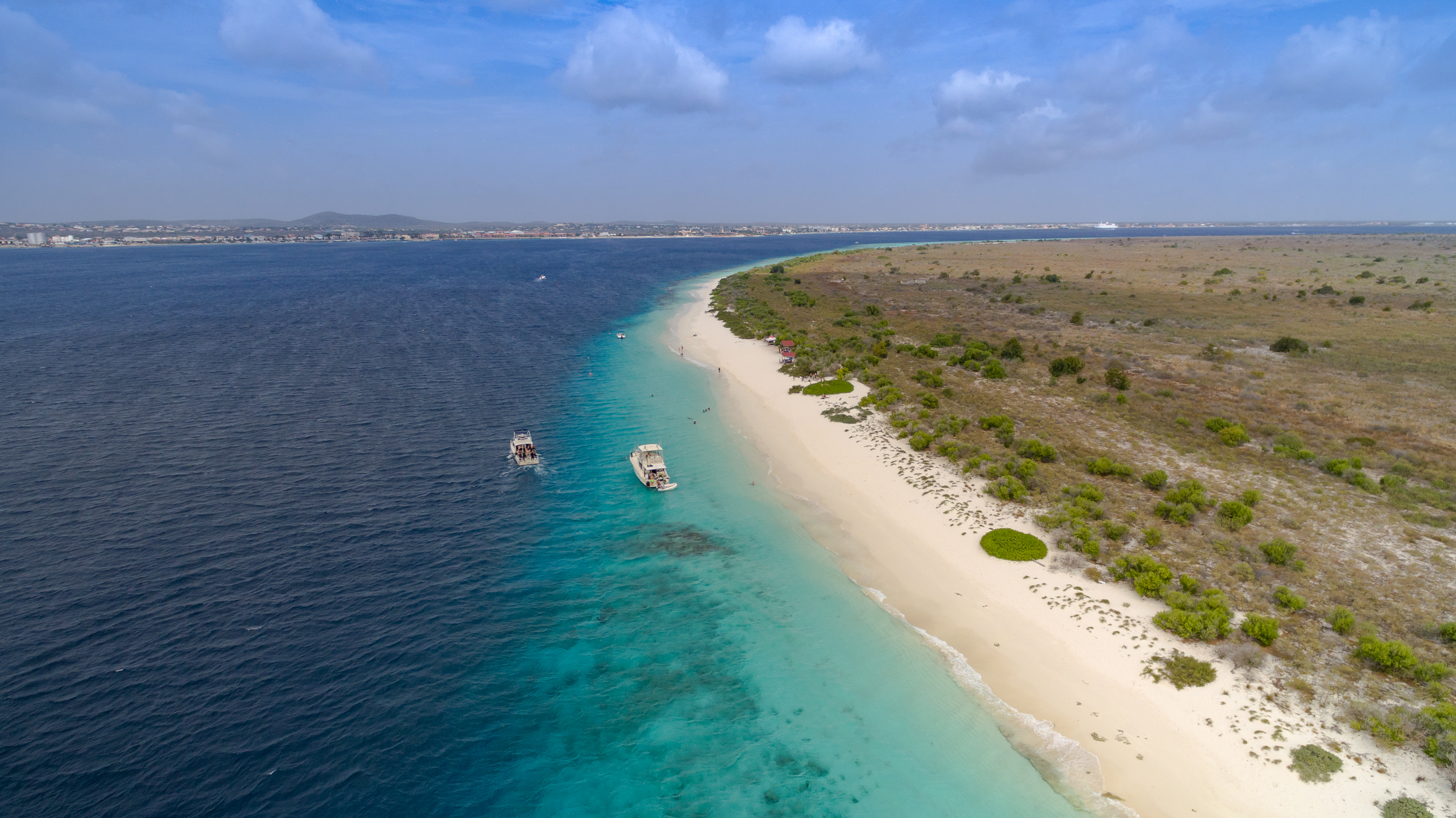
Klein Bonaire, Netherlands

== Islands ==
The Leeward Antilles comprise (roughly from west to east):

- State of Falcón (Venezuela)
  - Paraguaná/Cora Island
- ABC islands (a part of the Kingdom of the Netherlands)
  - Aruba, a constituent country of the Kingdom of the Netherlands
  - Bonaire, a part of the Caribbean Netherlands (public body of the Netherlands proper)
  - Curaçao, a constituent country of the Kingdom of the Netherlands
- Federal Dependencies of Venezuela (Note: Also includes Aves Island, geographically in the Caribbean Sea but not a part of the Leeward Antilles.)
  - La Blanquilla Island
  - La Orchila Island
  - La Sola Island
  - La Tortuga Island
  - Las Aves Archipelago
  - Los Frailes Archipelago
  - Los Hermanos Archipelago
  - Los Monjes Archipelago
  - Los Roques Archipelago
  - Los Testigos Islands (Note: East of the State of Nueva Esparta.)
  - Patos Island (Note: East of the State of Sucre.)
- State of Nueva Esparta (Venezuela)
  - Coche Island
  - Cubagua Island
  - Margarita Island
