= Gaspard Goyrand =

French anatomist

- Born: Gaspard Goyrand; 3 February 1803
- Died: 23 June 1866 (aged 63)
- Occupations: Physician, surgeon, politician
- Parent(s): Gabriel-Antoine Goyrand; Marie Eulalie Ravanas
- Relatives: Jean-Louis Goyrand (paternal great-uncle)

Gaspard Goyrand (3 February 1803 – 23 June 1866) was a French general practitioner, surgeon and politician from Aix-en-Provence. He helped treat cholera from 1835 to 1854, while serving as Deputy Mayor of Aix from 1838 to 1848.

== Early life ==
Jean-Gaspard Goyrand was born in 1803. He was the son of Gabriel-Antoine Goyrand (1754-1826), a religious painter, and Marie Eulalie Ravanas (1762-1825). His father was in exile in Italy during the French Revolution of 1789, and later returned to Aix. His great-uncle, Jean-Louis Goyrand (1718-1790), was a Professor of Medicine at the University of Aix-en-Provence.

He received his doctorate degree in Paris in 1828, where he was taught by Guillaume Dupuytren. He later disagreed with his former professor.

== Career ==
He practised as a physician and surgeon in Aix-en-Provence. From 1835 to 1854, he treated patients with cholera. In the 1850s, he moved to Lourmarin during a third epidemic of cholera. He also served as supervisor of the hot spring in Aix. People believed hot springs were a cure for certain diseases, at the time.

From 1838 to 1848, he served as the Deputy-Mayor of Aix-en-Provence.

He is remembered for a type of wrist-spraining which was named after him.

== Death ==
He died in 1866.

== Legacy ==
The Rue Goyrand, in the Quartier Mazarin of Aix-en-Provence, is named in his honour. It runs from the Rue Laroque to the Rue Frédéric Mistral.
