= Marnix van Rij =

Dutch politician (born 1960)

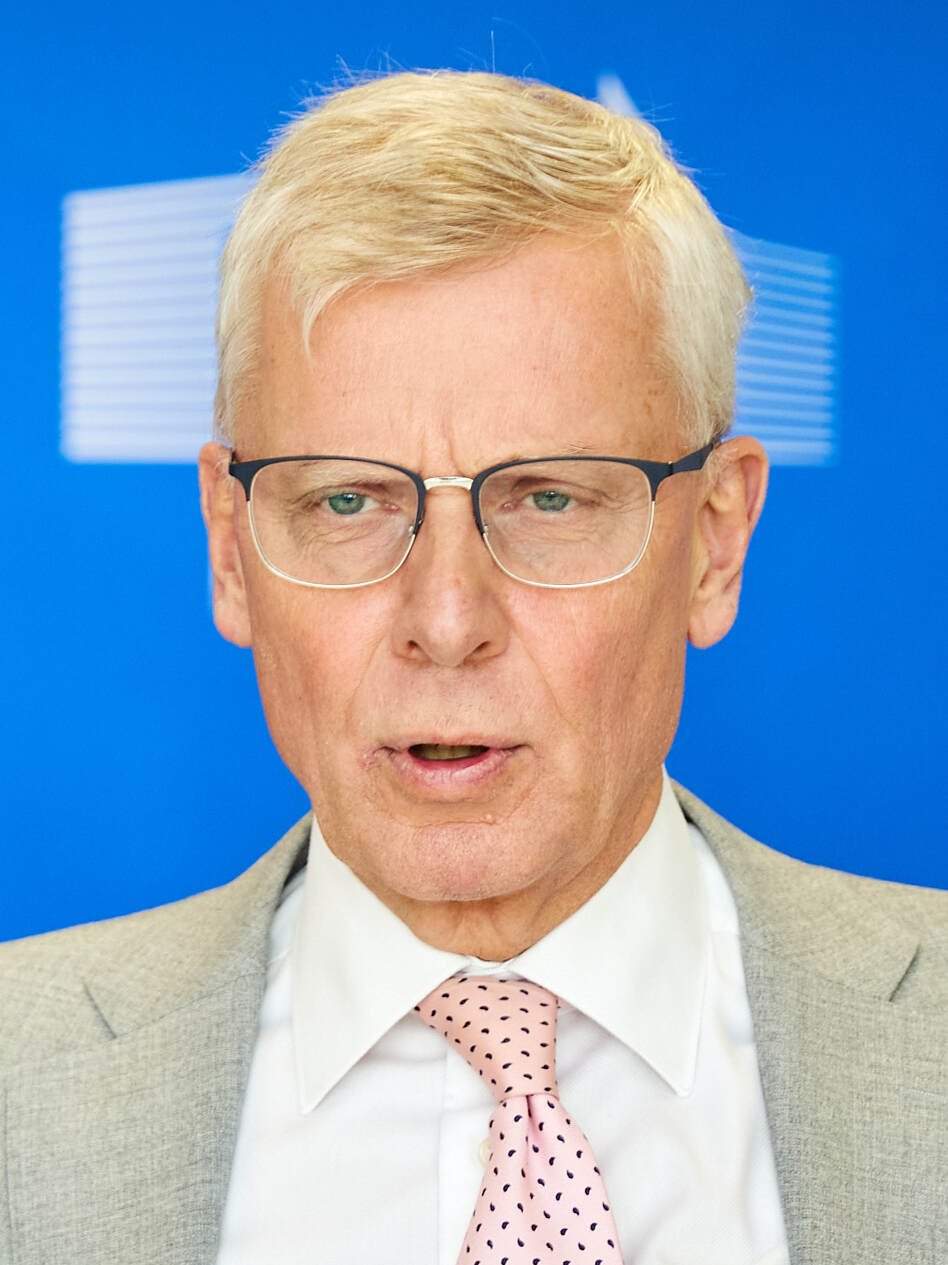
- Marnix van Rij in 2022

State Secretary for Finance
- In office 10 January 2022 – 2 July 2024 Serving with Aukje de Vries
- Prime Minister: Mark Rutte
- Preceded by: Hans Vijlbrief; Alexandra van Huffelen
- Succeeded by: Folkert Idsinga; Nora Achahbar

Lieutenant Governor of Sint Eustatius
- In office 15 February 2020 – 18 April 2021
- Monarch: Willem-Alexander
- Preceded by: Marcolino Franco
- Succeeded by: Alida Francis

Member of the Senate
- In office 9 June 2015 – 11 June 2019

Chair of the Christian Democratic Appeal
- In office 3 April 2021 – 11 December 2021; Acting
- Preceded by: Rutger Ploum
- Succeeded by: Hans Huibers
- In office 27 February 1999 – 10 October 2001
- Preceded by: Hans Helgers
- Succeeded by: Bert de Vries (acting)

Personal details
- Born: Marnix Leonard Alexander van Rij; 25 October 1960 (age 65) Rotterdam, Netherlands
- Party: Christian Democratic Appeal (since 1984)
- Spouse: Courtney van Rij
- Children: 6
- Education: Leiden University
- Occupation: Politician; Jurist; Management consultant

Marnix Leonard Alexander van Rij (Dutch: [ˈmɑrnɪks fɑn ˈrɛi]; born 25 October 1960) is a Dutch politician.

== Life ==
Van Rij grew up in Wassenaar, and he started his career in 1983 as a tax assistant at a tax firm. In addition, he became a member of the Wassenaar Municipal Council in 1986. He moved to professional services firm Ernst & Young (EY) in 1994, and he became a partner in January 1998. He was party chair of the Christian Democratic Appeal (CDA) from 1999 until 2001. He also served as a Senator, a part-time position in the Netherlands, from 2015 to 2019. As a senator, his portfolio consisted of tax affairs, among other themes. On 15 February 2020, Van Rij was appointed as the Island Governor of Sint-Eustatius, and he left EY. After this, Van Rij was interim party chairman of the CDA from 3 April until 11 December 2021.

On 10 January 2022, Van Rij became State Secretary for Finance in the fourth Rutte cabinet. In an interview with newspaper Trouw, Van Rij told that he had declined to succeed Ronald Plasterk as informateur during the 2023–2024 cabinet formation, partly due to the CDA not being part of the talks. After the new right-wing governing coalition – consisting of the Party for Freedom (PVV), the People's Party for Freedom and Democracy (VVD), New Social Contract (NSC), and the Farmer–Citizen Movement (BBB) – had agreed that their party leaders would remain in parliament, Van Rij was one of the candidates identified to serve as prime minister in the resulting cabinet. He pulled out after his first interview, and Dick Schoof was eventually chosen. Van Rij's term as state secretary ended on 2 July 2024, when the Schoof cabinet was sworn in.

He started serving as deputy Executive Director of the Dutch-Belgian constituency at the International Monetary Fund (IMF) in Washington, D.C. on 1 November 2024.

== Personal life ==
Van Rij is in his second marriage with his American-born wife Courtney. The couple kept their house on Sint Eustatius after moving back to the Dutch mainland. Van Rij has six children.

== Bibliography ==
- Reflecties van een politieke optimist (in Dutch). Prometheus. 2025. ISBN 978-90-446-5607-7.
- Duizend dagen in de landspolitiek. Leiderschapscrisis in het CDA (in Dutch). Meulenhoff. 2002. ISBN 978-90-290-7159-8.
