= Toni Gaspar =

Spanish politician (born 1973)

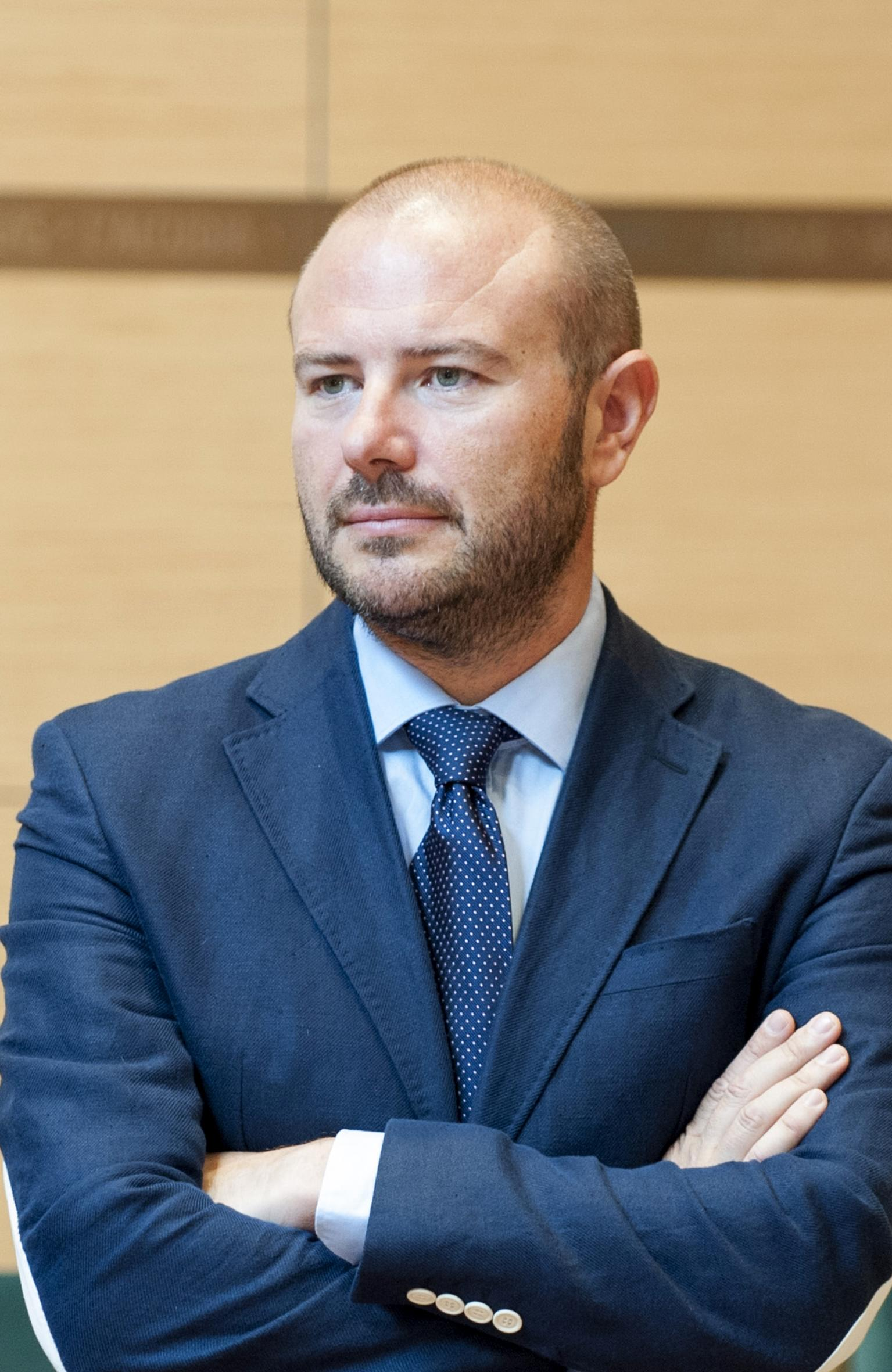
- Gaspar in 2015

President of the Provincial Deputation of Valencia
- In office 16 July 2018 – 11 July 2023
- Preceded by: Jorge Rodríguez Gramage
- Succeeded by: Vicente Mompó

Personal details
- Born: 6 December 1973 (age 52)
- Party: Socialist Party of the Valencian Country

Antoni Francesc Gaspar Ramos (born 6 December 1973) is a Spanish politician serving as a member of the Corts Valencianes since 2023. From 2018 to 2023, he served as president of the provincial deputation of Valencia. From 2003 to 2023, he served as mayor of Faura.
