= Edison Rijna =

Dutch politician

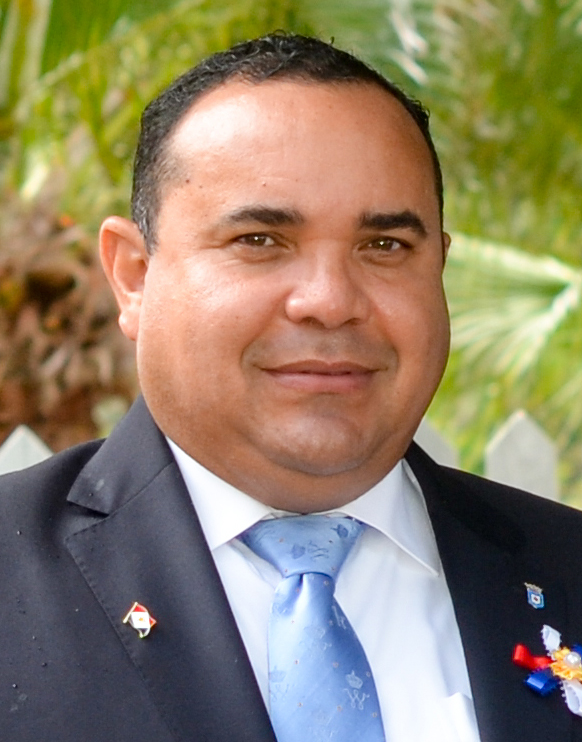

Island Governor of Bonaire
- In office 22 August 2014 – 18 April 2023
- Monarch: Willem-Alexander
- Preceded by: Lydia Emerencia
- Succeeded by: John Soliano

Personal details
- Born: 7 July 1967 (age 58) Bonaire
- Spouse: Freeke Kunst
- Children: Ivan Rijna, Rosa Rijna

Edison Enrique Rijna (born 7 July 1967) is a Dutch politician who was Lieutenant Governor of Bonaire from 2014 to 2023. He previously served as the acting Island governor from 1 March 2014 to 22 August 2014.

== Early life and career ==
Rijna was born on 7 July 1967 in Bonaire. As a child he attended Prinses Beatrix School and SGB High School on Bonaire. Afterwards, he moved to Curaçao, where he resided for some time working in different banks across the Caribbean. Upon moving back to Bonaire, he started a waste recycling company called Bon Recycling B.V in 2011 but soon after left again before moving back in the summer of 2014 to be Lieutenant Governor.

He was appointed acting Governor of Bonaire on 1 March after Lydia Emerencia announced her resignation after no longer having support of the Bonairean administrators, and he officially became governor on 20 August after being approved by the Dutch Council of Ministers on the recommendation of Ronald Plasterk in July. Upon becoming the governor on 22 August, he stated that his main priorities were increasing responsibility for disaster relief and moving away from traditional politics to become more approachable, as he stated he was apolitical.

In May 2020 his six-year term was extended, which was effective on 20 August. In October 2022 it was announced that Rijna would be sent on a two-week leave by the Bonaire Island Council on the vote of five of the nine parties who agreed that he needed to leave. He was criticized by them for facilitating construction projects in coral areas. It was agreed that Nolly Oleana would be Acting Island Governor to launch an investigation into the project.

== Personal life ==
He was married to Freeke Rijna-Kunst, who died in February 2017 after having cancer for years and then having a sudden brain hemorrhage. She was a lawyer and artist, and together they had two children named Ivan and Rosa.

== See also ==
- Gerald Berkel, former island governor of Sint Eustatius
- Jonathan Johnson, island governor of Saba.
- Evelyn Wever-Croes, Prime Minister of Aruba
- Gilmar Pisas, Prime Minister of Curacao
- Silveria Jacobs, Prime Minister of Sint Maarten
