= Gaspard Musabyimana =

Rwandan writer

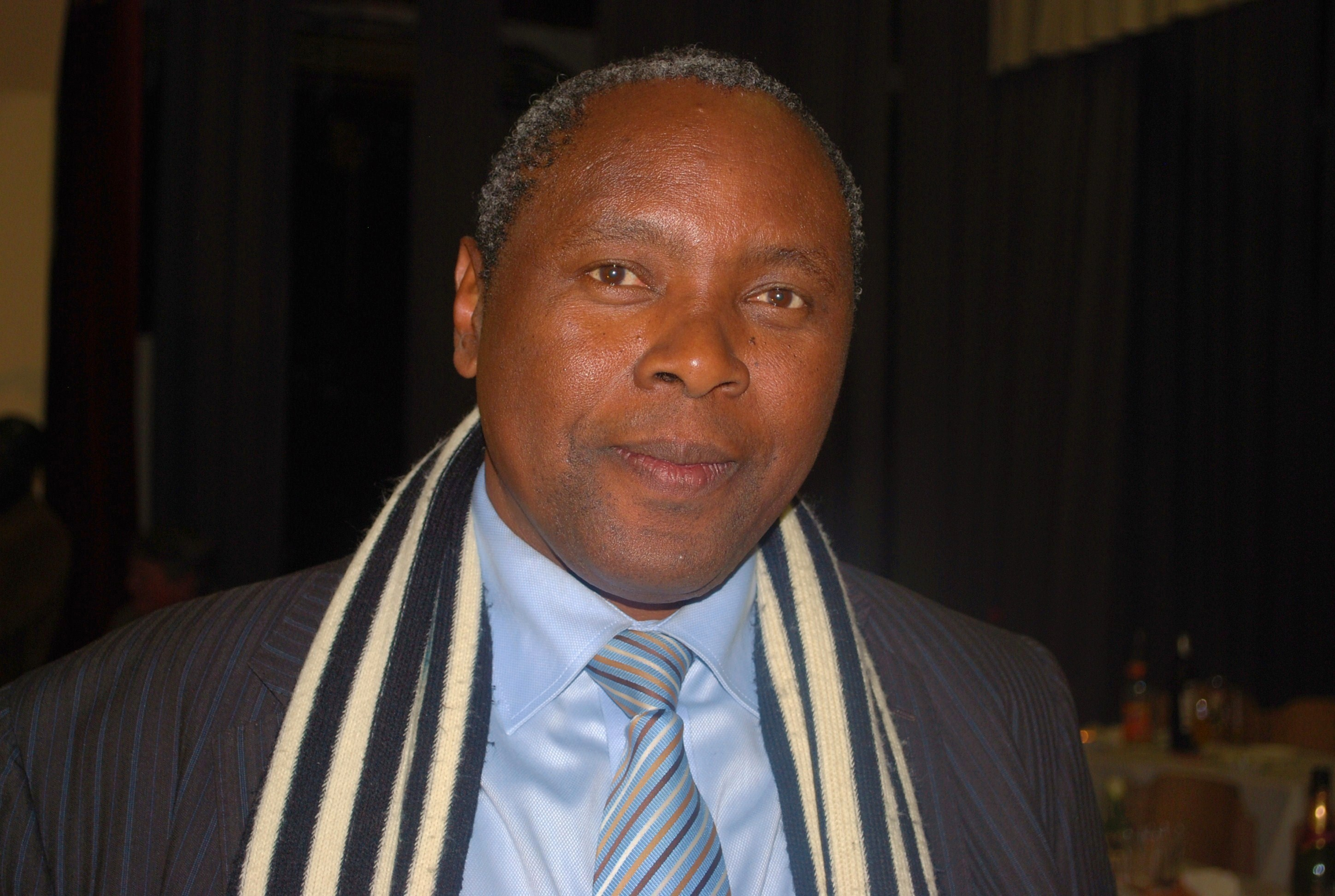
Gaspard Musabyimana (2011)

Gaspard Musabyimana (born 12 March 1955 in Nyamugali, Ruhengeri, Ruanda-Urundi) is a Rwandan writer and political commentator who currently lives in Belgium. He has had a multidisciplinary education.

== Publications ==
- Les années fatidiques pour le Rwanda. Coup d'œil sur les préparatifs intensifs de la « guerre d'octobre », 1986-1990, (Kigali, 1993)
- Sexualité, rites et mœurs sexuels de l'ancien Rwanda. Une facette de la culture rwandaise (Brussels 1999)
- La vraie nature du FPR. D'Ouganda en Rwanda (L'Harmattan, 2003)
- Sprookjes uit afrikaanse savanne (Brussels, Hujmos vzw, 2003). With some friends
- L'APR et les réfugiés rwandais au Zaïre 1996-1997. Un génocide nié (L'Harmattan, 2004)
- Pratiques et rites sexuels au Rwanda (L'Harmattan, 2006).
- Rwanda : le mythe des mots (L'Harmattan, 2008)
- Rwanda, le triomphe de la criminalité politique (L'Harmattan, 2009)
- Dictionnaire de l'histoire politique du Rwanda (Éditions Scribe, 2011).
- Rwanda. Vingt ans de pouvoir du FPR. Quel bilan? (Editions Scribe 2014) with Emmanuel Neretse.
