= Gaspar Méndez =

Spanish architect

Gaspar Méndez (fl. 1546) was a Spanish architect of the mid 16th century. He was noted for his prolific work on buildings in Badajoz, notably Badajoz Cathedral and the Adoratrices chapel. The tower of Badajoz Cathedral, 41 metres (135 ft) in height, was built in the Gothic style in 1542 under Méndez. Built with ashlar masonry, the windows are made of stone and carved. A street, Calle Gaspar Méndez, is named after him in the southwestern suburbs.
