= André Terrasson =

French Oratorian preacher

André Terrasson (1669 – 25 April 1723) was a French Oratorian preacher.

== Life ==
He was born at Lyon, the eldest son of a councillor of the Lyon presidial (court of justice). Gaspard Terrasson was his brother. Entering the Congregation of the Oratory, he devoted himself to preaching, where he gained a high reputation.

He preached the Lenten sermons of 1717 before Louis XIV, next at the Court of Lorraine, and later twice in the metropolitan church of Paris; the last of these series broke down his health and led to his death at Paris.

== Works ==
About fifty of his discourses, mostly delivered as Lenten lectures, are preserved, and were published at Paris (4 vols., 1726, 1736).
