= Gaspar (disambiguation) =

Gaspar is a human name.

Gaspar may also refer to:

- Gaspar, Santa Catarina, a town in Brazil
- Gaspar, Cuba
- Gașpar, Moldova
- Gaspar, Gaspra or Gasparalı, Autonomous Republic of Crimea
- Gaspar Strait, a waterway in Indonesia

== See also ==
- Gasper (disambiguation)
- Caspar (disambiguation)
