= Gaspar Grande =

Island in Trinidad and Tobago

Coordinates: 10°40′N 61°39′W

Nickname: Gasparee
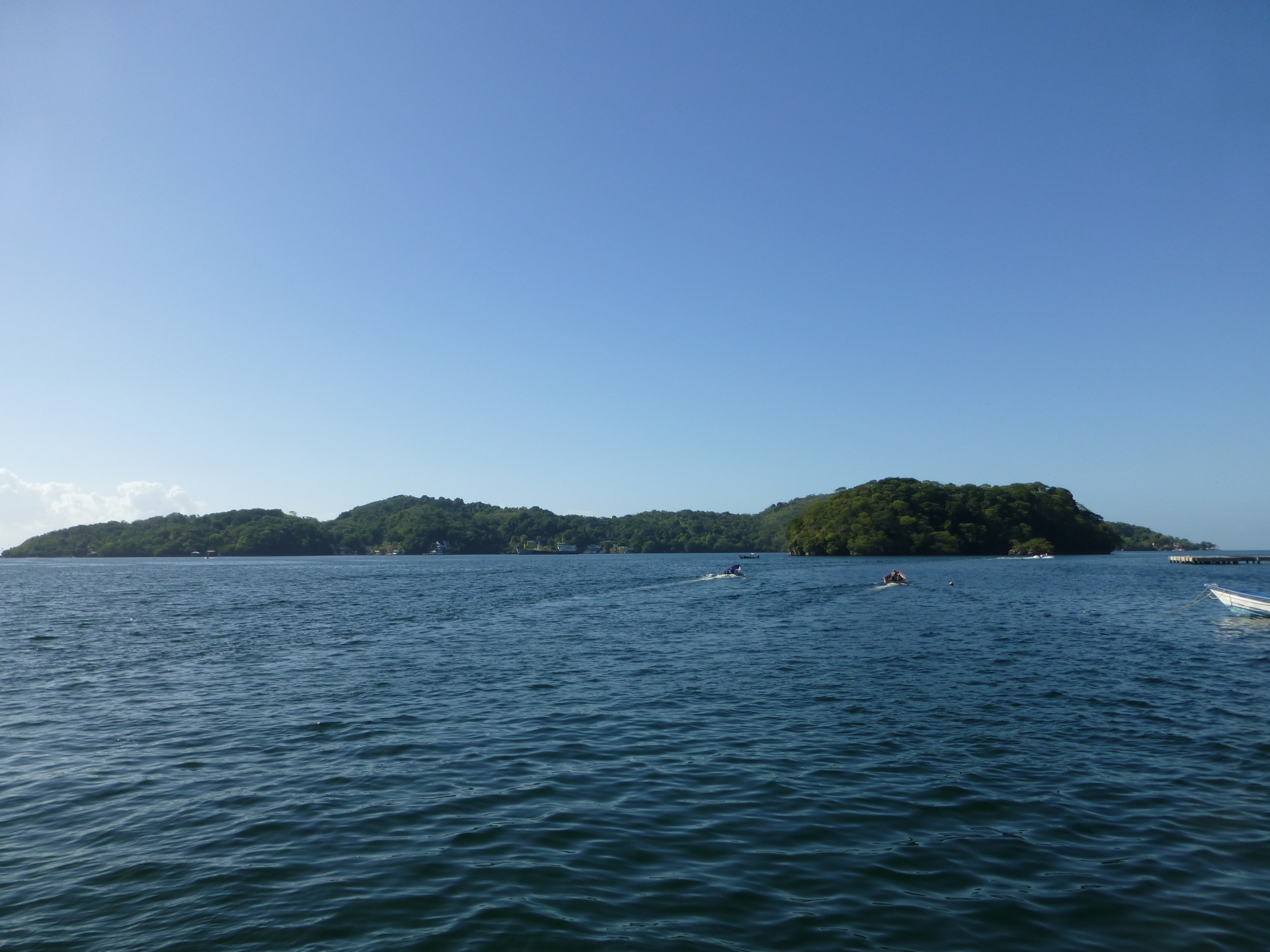
- Gaspar Grande island pictured in the background, with Gasparillo Island in the right foreground

Geography
- Total islands: 1
- Area: 1.29 km^{2} (0.50 sq mi)
- Highest elevation: 121 m (397 ft)

Administration
- Trinidad and Tobago

Gaspar Grande or Gasparee is an island in the Republic of Trinidad and Tobago named for Gaspar de Percín. The island is 1.29 km^{2} (0.50 square miles) in area and lies 12 km (7.5 mi) west of Port of Spain. It is one of the "Bocas Islands", which lie in the Bocas del Dragón (Dragon's Mouth) between Trinidad and Venezuela.

Gaspar Grande is primarily limestone, and reaches a height of 121 metres (397 ft) at its highest point. Gaspar Grande is home to the Gasparee Caves, a natural limestone cave system with a pool at its base (this pool being fed by the sea and influenced by the rise and fall of the tides). Other caves on the island include the White Cave, the Brioge Cavern and the Precipice Cavern. Vegetation on the island includes the Yellow Poui, Giant Cactus, Hog Plum, Silk Cotton, Agave, Manicou Fig, Naked Indian, Pelican Flower, Queen-of-the-Forest (Filipendula occidentalis), Cow Itch, Sugar Apple and Salt-fish Wood.

Legend has it that there might be a pirate's treasure chest stashed somewhere in another often semi-submerged cave on the island (referred to as William Dampier's Tunnel) and that this cave is supposedly only easily accessible on certain days of the year at low tide. This legend remains largely unsupported by evidence.

== History ==
In 1783, Gaspar Grande was granted to Gaspar de Percin Roque by governor José María Chacón. Events in its history include the Saga of Admiral Apodaca and the establishment of whaling stations on the island.

== Places ==
Pointe Baleine was once a whaling station, as indicated by its name, which is French for "whaling point". Located on the western end of Gaspar Grande, Pointe Baleine is one of the main drop off sites for visitors to the Gasparee Caves.

Bombshell Bay got its name from its historical past as there once was a fort located in this area. It is now a holiday resort.

Gasparee Caves is one of the more popular sites in Chaguaramas. The cave is full of geological formations such as stalactites, stalagmites, flowstones, pillars, ribbon, and fringed curtain.

Other landmarks on the island include Bordel Bay, Winn's Bay, Goodwill's Bay and St. Madeline Bay.

== Fauna ==
Terrestrial vertebrate fauna of the island is a depauperate subset of that found on the main island of Trinidad. Given their ability to easily move over the narrow sea straights between both Trinidad and Venezuela, the most specious class of terrestrial vertebrates on the island are the birds. Among the birds commonly encountered on the island are American Black Vultures, Turkey Vultures, Brown Pelicans, Great Kiskadees, Ruddy Ground Doves, White-tipped Doves, Yellow-headed Caracaras, Orange-winged Amazon Parrots and Bananaquits. Non-avian reptiles are the next well represented vertebrates, with snakes such as Boddaert's tropical racers and lizards including Green Iguanas, Turnip-tailed Geckos, Wiegmann's striped geckos, Underwood's Spectacled Tegus and the introduced Grenada bush anoles being fairly commonly encountered. The Trinidad Northern Coral Snake - Micrurus circinalis - is the only potentially dangerous venomous snake known from Gaspar Grande. There are a few mammals known from the island, inclusive of the Southern opossum and several species of bats that make use of the limestone cave and sinkhole systems, tree cavities and even human built structures present.

Among the myriad of invertebrates present, the Amazonian Giant Centipede (known to grow up to 30 centimetres in length) is perhaps the most notable.

== See also ==
- Islands of Trinidad and Tobago
