= Gaspard Terrasson =

French Oratorian

Gaspard Terrasson (October 1680 – 2 January 1752) was a French Oratorian, teaching humanities and afterwards philosophy, and later a well-known preacher.

== Life ==
Terrasson was born at Lyon. His oratorical talents were revealed at Troyes, 1711, on delivering the funeral oration of the Dauphin, son of Louis XIV; but he did not devote himself to preaching till after the death in 1723 of his brother André Terrasson, when he fulfilled several engagements which the latter had made. For five years he preached at Paris, and finally delivered a Lenten course in the Church of Notre Dame.

He appealed repeatedly against the papal bull Unigenitus; he was the anonymous author of twelve "Lettres sur la justice chrétienne" (Paris, 1733), in which, to support the Jansenists whom the bishops deprived of the sacraments, he endeavoured to prove the inutility of sacramental confession. This work was condemned by the faculty of theology at Paris (1 Sept., 1734), and by the Archbishops of Sens and Embrun, as containing erroneous, schismatical and heretical assertions.

Terrasson had to leave the Oratory and abandon preaching. He withdrew to the Diocese of Auxerre where the bishop, Charles de Caylus, a well-known Jansenist, confided to him the care of Treigni. But he was soon arrested (Oct., 1735) by the order of the king for his Jansenistic activities, and was confined during nine years either at Vincennes or with the Minims of Argenteuil. A belated retraction, the authenticity or sincerity of which has never been well established, was attributed to him. He was living in retirement with his family when he died at Paris.

== Works ==
A volume of his discourses appeared at Utrecht in 1733, but the first real edition was at Paris in 1744 (4 vols.). The sermons of the two brothers were reprinted by Migne in his "Collection des orateurs sacrés", XXIX (Paris, 1849).
