= Gašpar =

Gašpar ([gaʃpar]) is a Slavic surname, cognate to Gaspar (given name). Notable people with this surname include:

- Alojz Gašpar (1848–1919), known in Hungarian as Alajos Gáspár, Hungarian-Slovene writer
- Đuro Gašpar (1900–1981), Croatian athlete
- Josip Gašpar (born 1973), Croatian footballer
- Jozef Gašpar (born 1977), Slovak football player
- Renato Gašpar (born 1977), Croatian alpine skier
- Robert Gašpar (born 1981), known in Australia as Robert Gaspar, football player
- Tibor Gašpar (born 1962), Slovak politician

As a given name, it may refer to:

- Gašpar Perušić (died 1507), 15th century Croatian nobleman
