= Gașpar =

- Village
- Location within Edineț
- Coordinates: 48°9′21″N 27°29′48″E
- Country: Moldova

Government
  - Mayor: Oleg Horodișteanu (PLDM)
- Elevation: 216 m (709 ft)

Population (2014 census)
  - Total: 1,270
- Time zone: UTC+2 (EET)
  - Summer (DST): UTC+3 (EEST)
- Postal code: MD-4629

Gașpar is a village in Edineț District, Moldova.

== Demographics ==
According to the 2014 Moldovan census, Gașpar had a population of 1,270 residents. The village covers an area of 21.7 km², resulting in a population density of approximately 58.5 inhabitants per square kilometer in 2014. Between the 2004 and 2014 censuses, Gașpar experienced a slight population decline of 0.52%.

Women comprised a small majority of the population, making up 52.5%, while men accounted for 47.5%. Children aged 0–14 represented 19.9% of the population, 63.4% were of working age (15–64), and 16.7% were seniors aged 65 and over. The entire population lived in rural areas.

Most residents (97.6%) were born in Moldova, with a small number (2.4%) born in other Commonwealth of Independent States countries. Ethnically, the village was predominantly Moldovans (74.6%), followed by Ukrainians (22.9%), Russians (1.8%), and a small number of Romanians (0.6%). Moldovan was the most commonly reported native language (59.6%), followed by Russian (15.2%), Romanian (12.6%), and Ukrainian (12.5%).

The majority of residents identified as Orthodox (88%), while 12% adhered to other religions.

== Administration and local government ==
Gașpar is governed by a local council composed of nine members. The most recent local elections, in November 2023, resulted in the following composition: 4 councillors from the Party of Socialists of the Republic of Moldova, 2 councillors from the Liberal Democratic Party of Moldova, 1 councillor from the European Social Democratic Party, 1 councillor from the Dignity and Truth Platform, and 1 councillor from the League of Cities and Communes. In the same elections, the candidate from the Liberal Democratic Party of Moldova, Oleg Horodișteanu, was re-elected as mayor.
