= Gaspard =

Gaspard may refer to:

- Gaspard (name)
- Gaspard (novel), 1915 French novel by René Benjamin which won the Prix Goncourt
- Gaspard and Lisa (TV series), a British–American–French animated television series
- Gaspard the Fox, a real urban fox whose fictional story is told in a picture book by Zeb Soanes and James Mayhew
- Gaspard, Saint-Jean-du-Sud, Haiti, a village in the Sud department of Haiti
- Gaspard de la nuit, piano suite (1908) by Maurice Ravel
- Pic Gaspard, a mountain in the French Alps
- Colonel Gaspard, the nom-de-guerre of French Resistance leader Émile Coulaudon (1907–1977)
