= Alida Francis =

Dutch civil servant

Her Excellency M. Alida U. Francis
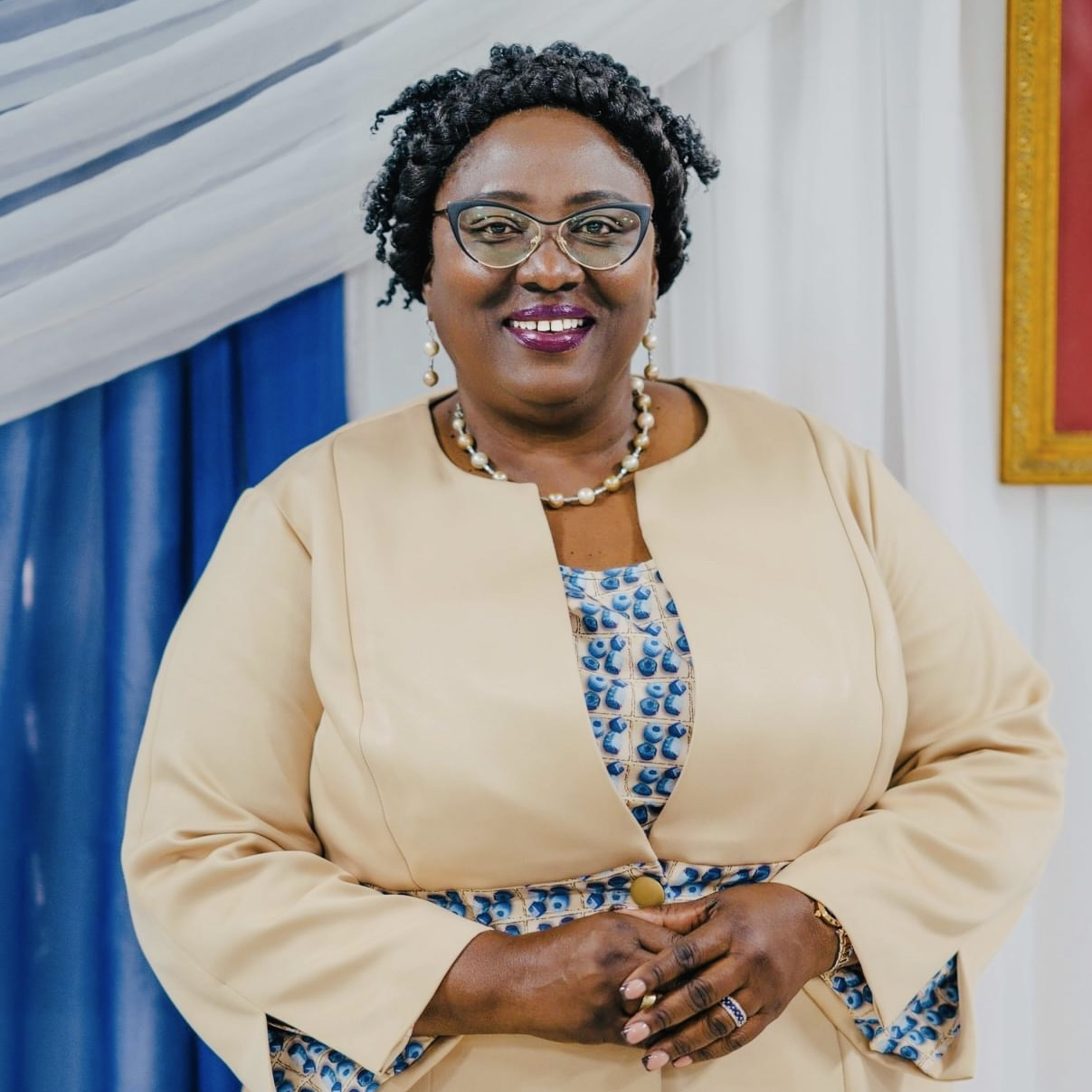

Island Governor of Sint Eustatius
- Incumbent
- Assumed office 10 April 2024
- Monarch: Willem-Alexander
- Preceded by: Marnix van Rij

Government Commissioner of Sint Eustatius
- In office June 22, 2021 – March 27, 2024
- Preceded by: Marnix van Rij

Deputy Government Commissioner
- In office February 15, 2020 – June 23, 2021
- Preceded by: Mervyn Keith Maria Stegers
- Succeeded by: Claudia Toet

Senior Communication Advisor for the Ministry of the Interior and Kingdom affairs
- In office February 2010 – February 2020

Director of Tourism at the St. Eustatius Tourism Development Foundation
- In office September 1992 – February 2010

Protocol and Public Relations manager at the Government St. Maarten
- In office June 1990 – July 1992

Personal details
- Born: Marjorie Alida Uveline Francis; 1965 (age 60–61) Sint Eustatius
- Occupation: Governor
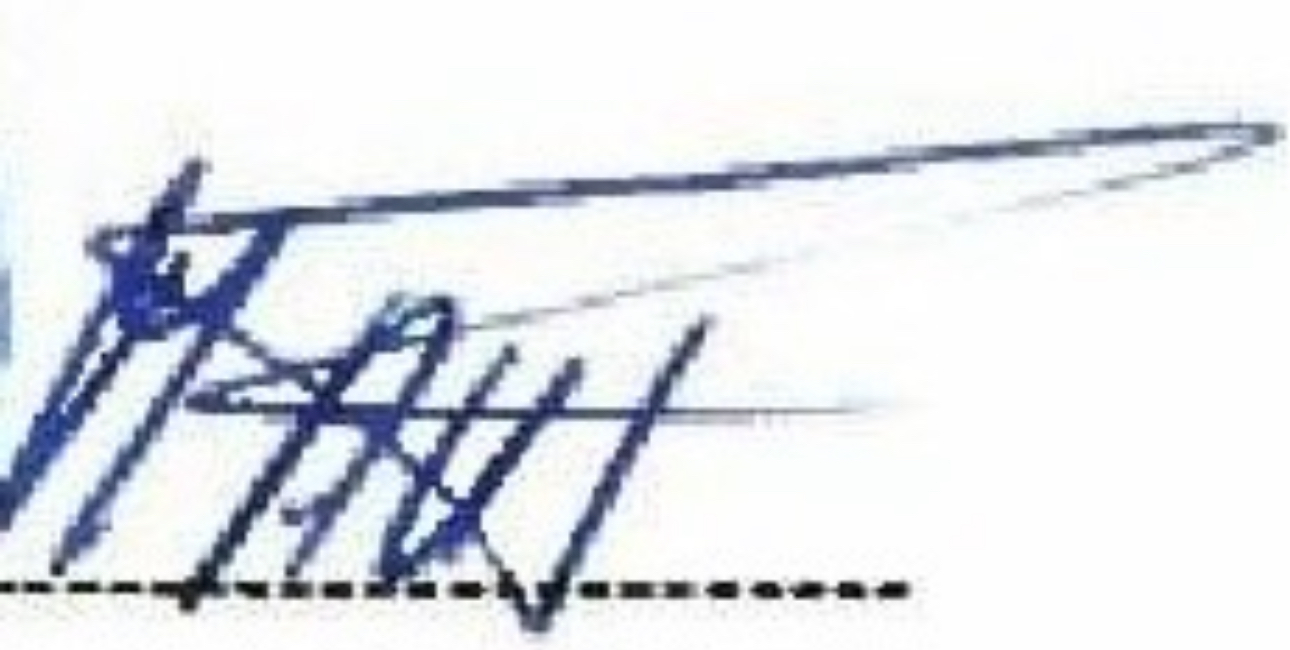
- Signature
- Website: https://www.linkedin.com/in/lady-alida-francis-86160719 & https://www.facebook.com/statiagovernment?mibextid=PtKPJ9
- Nickname: Lady Alida/Lida

M. Alida U. Francis is a Dutch civil servant who has been appointed island Governor of Sint Eustatius on April 10, 2024. She is the first woman to hold this position out of 400 Island Governors.

== Early life and education ==
Francis was born and raised on St. Eustatius. Between 1977 and 1985 she lived in Aruba, where she obtained her HAVO diploma at the Colegio Arubano. She then went on to study journalism at the Hogeschool Utrecht.

== Career ==
Her career started in 1989 as a broadcast journalist in Sint Maarten. A year later she transferred to the government, where she started working in the office of the Lieutenant Governor of Sint Maarten as a specialist in protocol and public relations. Between 1992 and 2010 she was director of the Sint Eustatius Tourism Development Foundation. In 1995 she was appointed a member of the Nation Building Committee of the Netherlands Antilles on behalf of Sint Eustatius. On 27 April 2007, Alida Francis was appointed a Knight of the Order of Orange-Nassau.

From 2010, Alida Francis was employed by the National Office for the Caribbean Netherlands, where as acting head of communication she is responsible for all communication strategies for the BES islands. After hurricane Irma, she made an important contribution to the reconstruction of St. Eustatius.

Francis was appointed Hon. Deputy Government Commissioner of St. Eustatius on 15 February 2020, succeeding Mervyn Stegers . Together with His Excellency Government Commissioner, Marnix van Rij. Since taking charge, Ms. Francis has been responsible for getting the Government on St. Eustatius back on course. The functions of government commissioner and the deputy government commissioners were appointed in February 2018 after the executive council and the island council of St. Eustatius were set aside due to an accusation of gross neglect of duties. She was appointed Government Commissioner of St. Eustatius with effect from 22 June 2021. Her successor as Hon. Deputy Government Commissioner was Nicoline van der Linden-Geertsema. On March 8, 2024 M. Alida Francis was appointed as the 1st Female Governor of Sint Eustatius among the 400 Governors in history. Her appointment ceremony was held on April 10, 2024.
