= Oranjestad, Sint Eustatius =

Oranjestad
- Capital city
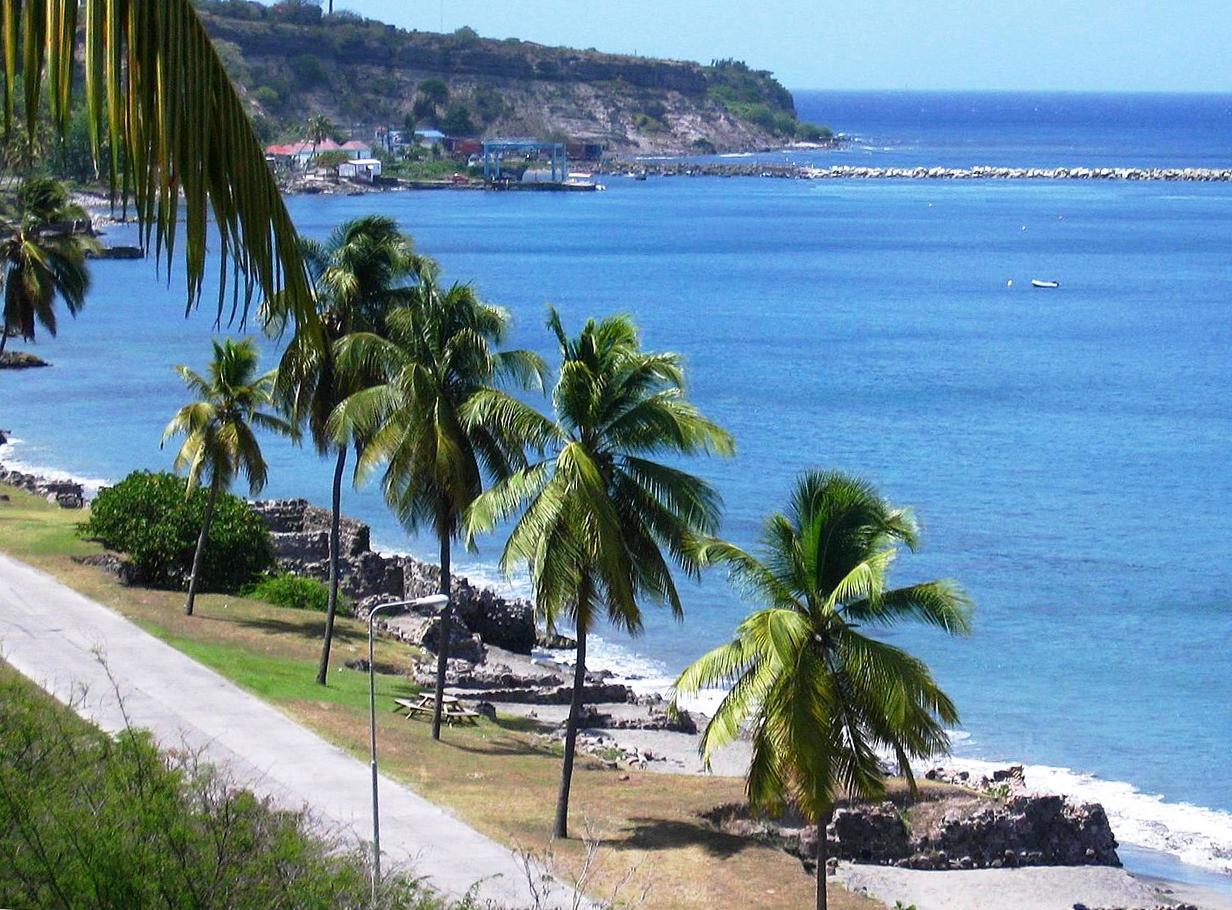
- Beach of Lower Town

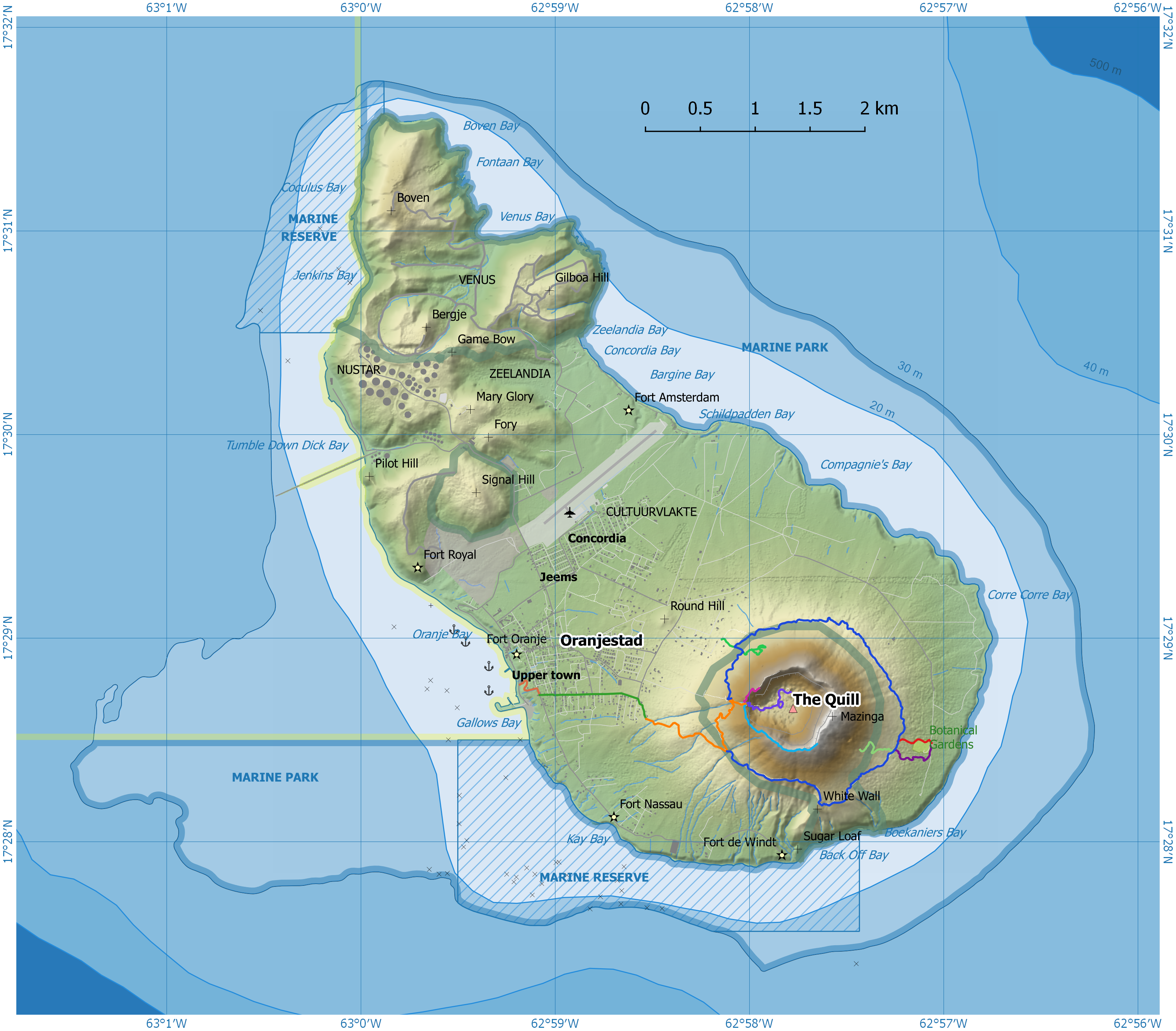
- Location within Sint Eustatius

- Location within North America
- Coordinates: 17°28′57″N 62°59′9″W
- Country: Netherlands
- Public body: Sint Eustatius

Population (2001)
  - Total: 1,038
- Time zone: UTC-4 (AST)
- Climate: Aw
- Oranjestad Lighthouse
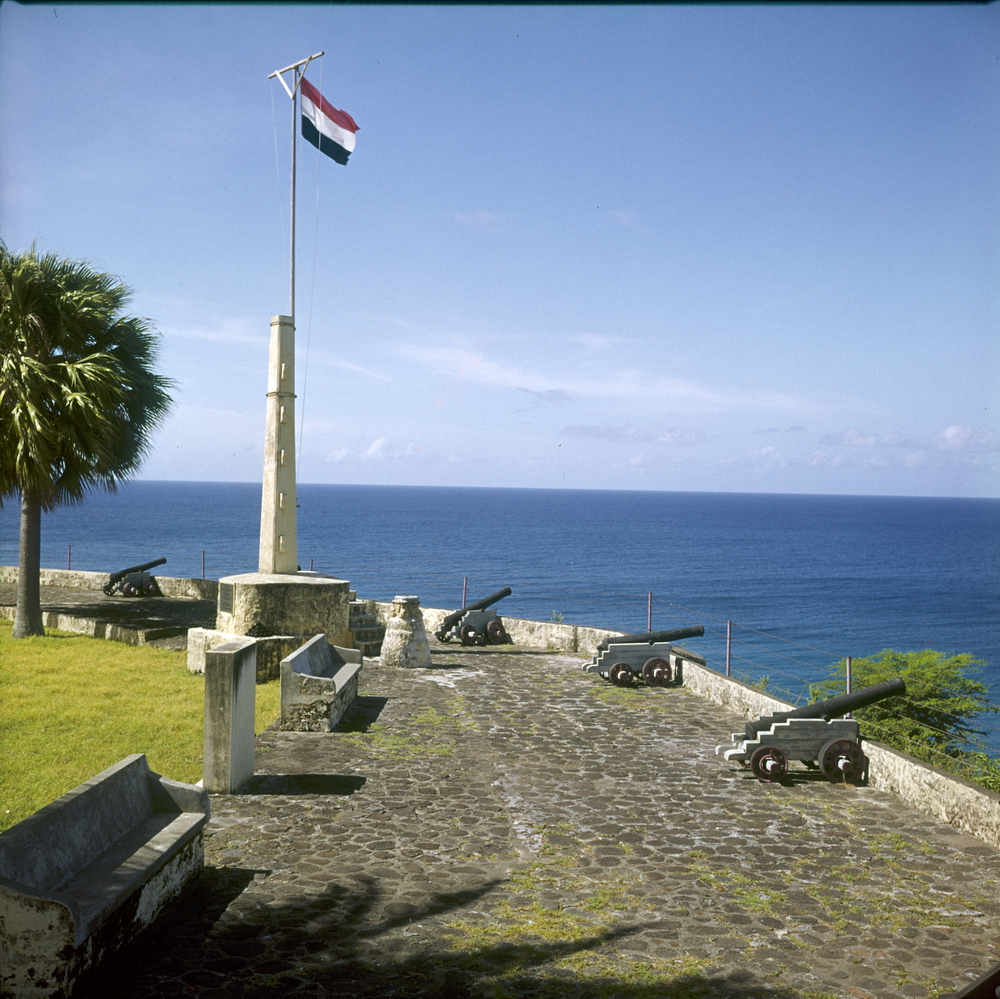
- Constructed: 1893 (first)
- Foundation: concrete base
- Construction: metal skeletal tower
- Height: 20 m (66 ft)
- Shape: square pyramidal skeletal tower with balcony and light
- Power source: solar power
- Focal height: 40 m (130 ft)
- Range: 17 nmi (31 km; 20 mi)
- Characteristic: Fl (3) W 15s.

Oranjestad (Dutch pronunciation: [oːˈrɑɲəstɑt]; English: Orange Town) is a small town of 1,038 inhabitants; it is the capital and largest town of the island of Sint Eustatius in the Caribbean Netherlands.

== Geography ==
Oranjestad is a historic harbour town which is divided into two main sections. Lower Town is a strip of buildings just above sea level along the waterfront, which borders on the island's safest beach. Lower Town includes dive shops, numerous colonial-era ruins, and the harbour. Upper Town has a restored historic core, and is also the island's main commercial and residential centre. It is nestled between Quill & Boven National Park

Neighborhoods of Oranjestad:

- Golden Rock
- Bay Brow

== History ==
=== Historical sites ===
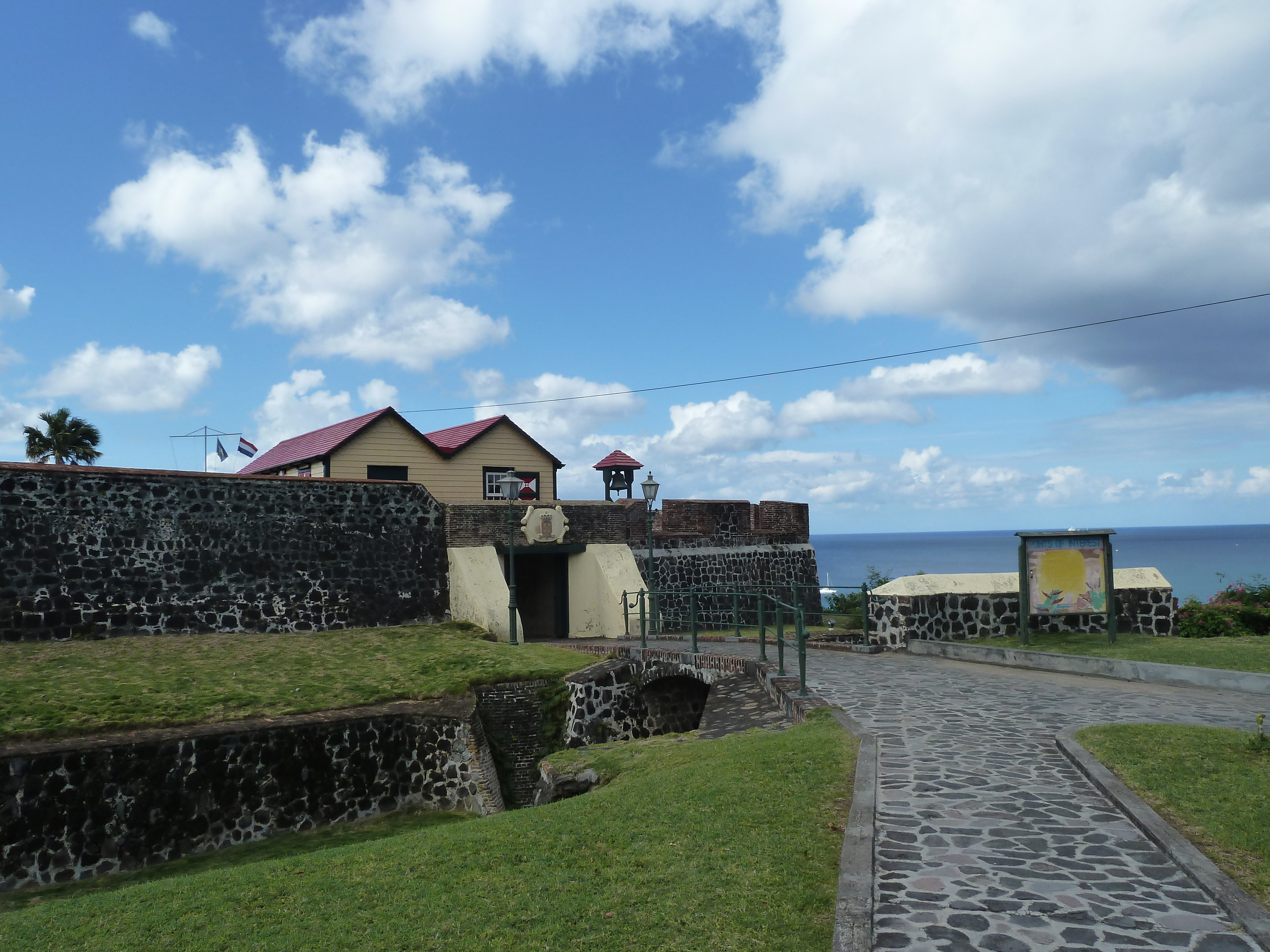
Fort Oranje

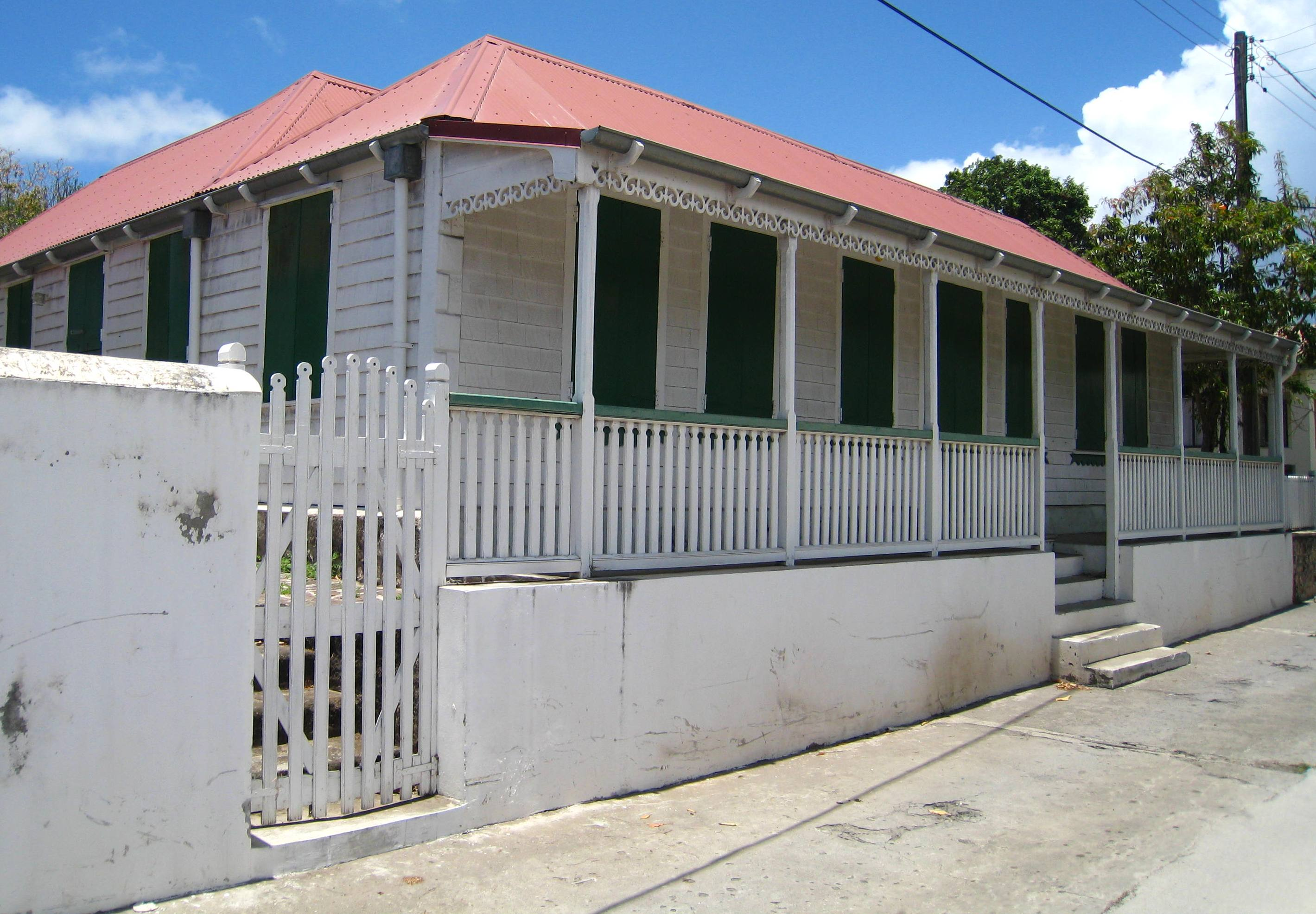
The restored 'Gezaghebber House' on Kerkstraat

The first colonist arrived between 1625 and 1629. Sint Eustatius produced sugar and cotton, but most importantly developed into a centre of the North American slave trade. In 1780, the island had an estimated population of 20,000 people including slaves. In 1781, during the Fourth Anglo-Dutch War, the island was captured and plundered by George Rodney. During the capture, all archives were destroyed. In 1786, it was home to 7,600 people (3,000 white, 600 coloureds and 4,000 slaves). In 1829, the population had decreased to 2,273.

The main historical site in Oranjestad is Fort Oranje, a well-maintained, 17th-century fort in the direct centre of the town, overlooking the waterfront. This cliff-side fort has cannons, intact bastions and a courtyard. Nearby is a museum, the ruins of one of the oldest synagogues in the Western Hemisphere, and a Jewish cemetery.

The town's historical features also include a Dutch Reformed church built in 1755, which is partly in ruins but still accessible (its tower can be climbed for long-distance views), various restored 18th-century merchants' residences – including the oldest one, the Gezaghebber House (former Lieutenant Governor's residence) on Kerkstraat – and restored wooden Caribbean-style houses. Snorkeling in Oranje Bay is also interesting because of the parts of 18th century buildings on the bay side that were swept into the sea.

== Facilities ==
Oranjestad itself contains grocery stores, restaurants, bars, a library, schools, a clinic and the administrative offices of the government.

=== Climate ===
Climate data for Oranjestad, Sint Eustatius, 1971-2000 normals
Month	Jan	Feb	Mar	Apr	May	Jun	Jul	Aug	Sep	Oct	Nov	Dec	Year
Record high °C (°F)	31.0 (87.8)	31.3 (88.3)	31.7 (89.1)	33.1 (91.6)	32.9 (91.2)	33.5 (92.3)	33.6 (92.5)	33.9 (93.0)	33.7 (92.7)	34.3 (93.7)	33.5 (92.3)	31.4 (88.5)	34.3 (93.7)
Mean daily maximum °C (°F)	28.3 (82.9)	28.4 (83.1)	28.8 (83.8)	29.4 (84.9)	30.1 (86.2)	30.8 (87.4)	31.1 (88.0)	31.2 (88.2)	31.0 (87.8)	30.6 (87.1)	29.8 (85.6)	28.7 (83.7)	29.9 (85.7)
Daily mean °C (°F)	25.3 (77.5)	25.2 (77.4)	25.5 (77.9)	26.2 (79.2)	27.1 (80.8)	27.9 (82.2)	28.0 (82.4)	28.1 (82.6)	27.9 (82.2)	27.4 (81.3)	26.6 (79.9)	25.5 (77.9)	26.7 (80.1)
Mean daily minimum °C (°F)	22.5 (72.5)	22.3 (72.1)	22.7 (72.9)	23.3 (73.9)	24.1 (75.4)	25.0 (77.0)	24.9 (76.8)	25.0 (77.0)	24.7 (76.5)	24.4 (75.9)	23.7 (74.7)	23.1 (73.6)	23.8 (74.9)
Record low °C (°F)	19.0 (66.2)	18.9 (66.0)	18.4 (65.1)	19.4 (66.9)	19.1 (66.4)	21.6 (70.9)	21.0 (69.8)	21.0 (69.8)	21.0 (69.8)	18.8 (65.8)	19.3 (66.7)	18.7 (65.7)	18.4 (65.1)
Average rainfall mm (inches)	52.0 (2.05)	50.5 (1.99)	48.8 (1.92)	55.7 (2.19)	87.1 (3.43)	60.6 (2.39)	74.1 (2.92)	106.9 (4.21)	123.2 (4.85)	106.5 (4.19)	128.6 (5.06)	74.6 (2.94)	985.8 (38.81)
Average rainy days (≥ 1.0 mm)	11.1	8.9	7.6	7.4	9.5	7.4	11.2	12.1	12.2	11.2	13.3	12.6	125.4
Source: Meteo Curacao

== See also ==
- List of lighthouses in Sint Eustatius
- F. D. Roosevelt Airport
- St. Eustatius Church

== Bibliography ==
- Benjamins, Herman Daniël; Snelleman, Johannes (1917). Encyclopaedie van Nederlandsch West-Indië (in Dutch). Leiden: Martinus Nijhoff Publishers.
