= Gerald Berkel =

Dutch island governor of Sint Eustatius

Island Governor of Sint Eustatius
- In office 1 April 2010 – 1 April 2016
- Monarchs: Beatrix; Willem-Alexander
- Preceded by: Hyden Gittens
- Succeeded by: Julian Woodley (acting)

Personal details
- Born: 21 September 1969 (age 56)
- Education: Florida Institute of Technology

Gerald Berkel (born 21 September 1969) was the Island Governor (Lieutenant Governor) of Sint Eustatius from 2010 to 2016.

Berkel was born in Sint Eustatius and completed his secondary education in Aruba. He received a bachelor's degree in computer engineering from Florida Institute of Technology in Melbourne, Florida, and returned to Sint Eustatius to work at the telephone company Eutel NV. In 2004, Berkel became the director of Eutel in 2004 and held that position until he became Lieutenant-Governor.

Berkel was appointed as the first Lieutenant Governor of Sint Eustatius on 1 April 2010, though he had been the acting lieutenant governor since 2003, in preparation for the dissolution of the Netherlands Antilles. His term ended on 1 April 2016.
