= Gasparillo Island =

Island in Trinidad and Tobago

Coordinates: 10°40′34.85″N 61°39′11.48″W

Nickname: Centipede Island, Little Gasparee
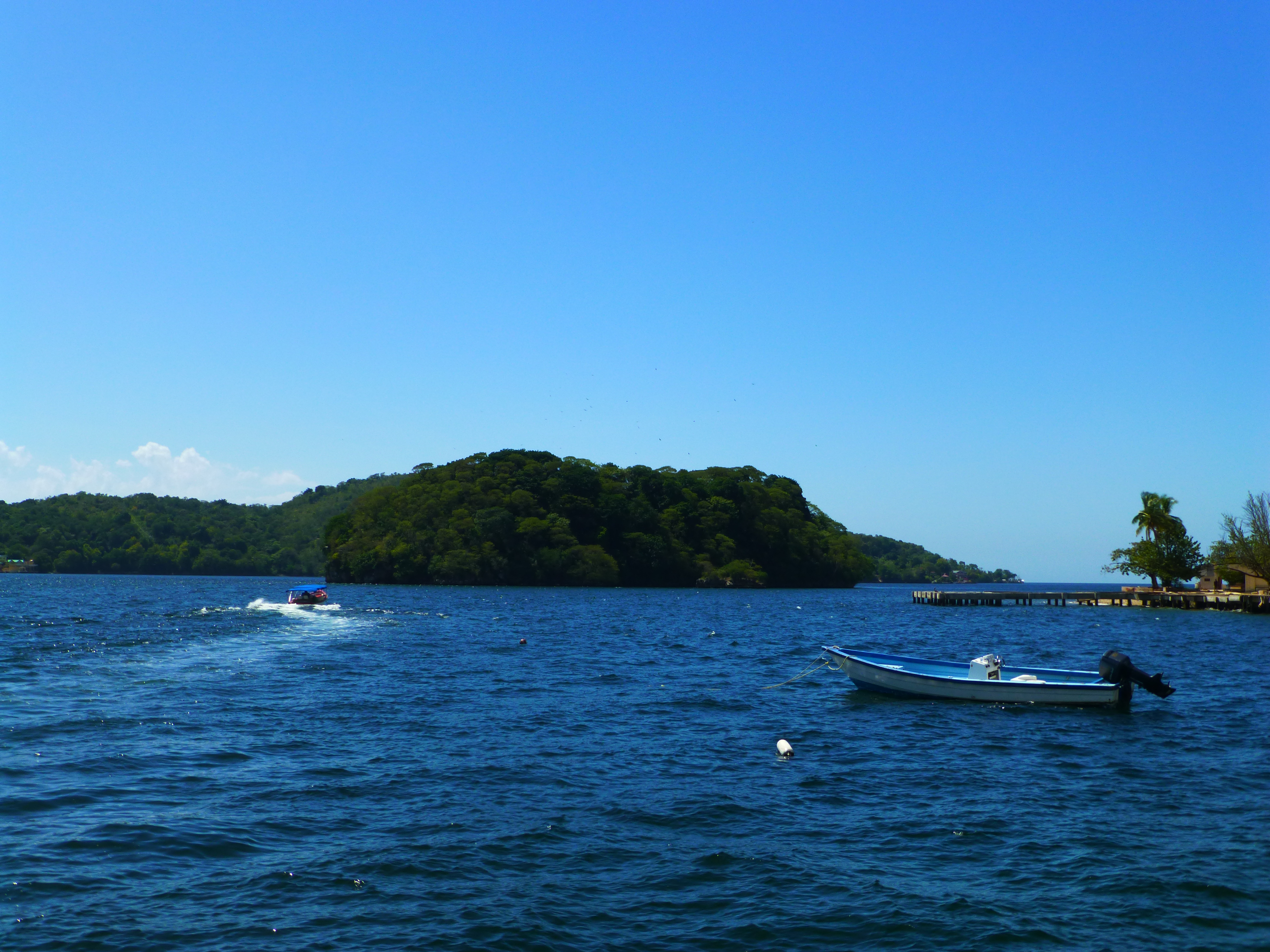
- Gasparillo Island in the right foreground, with Gaspar Grande island pictured behind

- Location within Trinidad and Tobago

Geography
- Total islands: 2

Administration
- Trinidad and Tobago

Demographics
- Population: Uninhabited (2015)

Gasparillo is a small island in the Republic of Trinidad and Tobago. It is one of the Bocas Islands (also referred to as Dragons' Teeth), which lie in the Bocas del Dragón (Spanish for Dragon's Mouths) between the main island of Trinidad and Venezuela. The island is currently uninhabited.

== Characteristics ==
Gasparillo is actually made up of two islands separated by several metres of rocks. However the second island is very small and is not independently named. The main island a little over 200 metres in length but is very narrow, less than 50 metres at its widest point, approximately 8,000 m^{2} in area. It is, as with most islands around the Paria Peninsular, covered with dry forest vegetation, and composed of a limestone bedrock with caves. Several species of birds nest at the island, including the short-tailed swift that nest on the eastern side of the island.

== History ==
The Gasparillo name has been derived because of its small size relative to the much larger Gaspar Grande Island, located just to the south of it. It has also been called Centipede Island due to the nature of its fauna. Sometime in the 19th century, it was also referred to as Gopee, based on one of its owners "Guppy", a Trinidad naturalist. He did not retain possession of the island due to a failure of paying land tax.

In the 20th century it was bought or leased by a businessman, C.C. Stollmeyer, with the intent of quarrying limestone from the island. However he found the makeup of the island was not conducive to the venture due to its hollowness. He subsequently leased the smaller island to the Gransaull family who built a holiday home. The United States leased areas in Trinidad under the Destroyers for Bases Agreement in 1940. Thus, the government regained possession of the island after World War II as United States military bases on Trinidad were disbanded in 1950.

Currently, the island is known for its recreational cliff jumping activities. The island is only accessible by swimming to its rocky eastern bank from a boat, before taking a steep and unmarked climb up the hills undergrowth. On the south side of the island is a 40-foot (12 meter) cliff where thrill seekers can jump to the sea.

== See also ==
- List of islands of Trinidad and Tobago

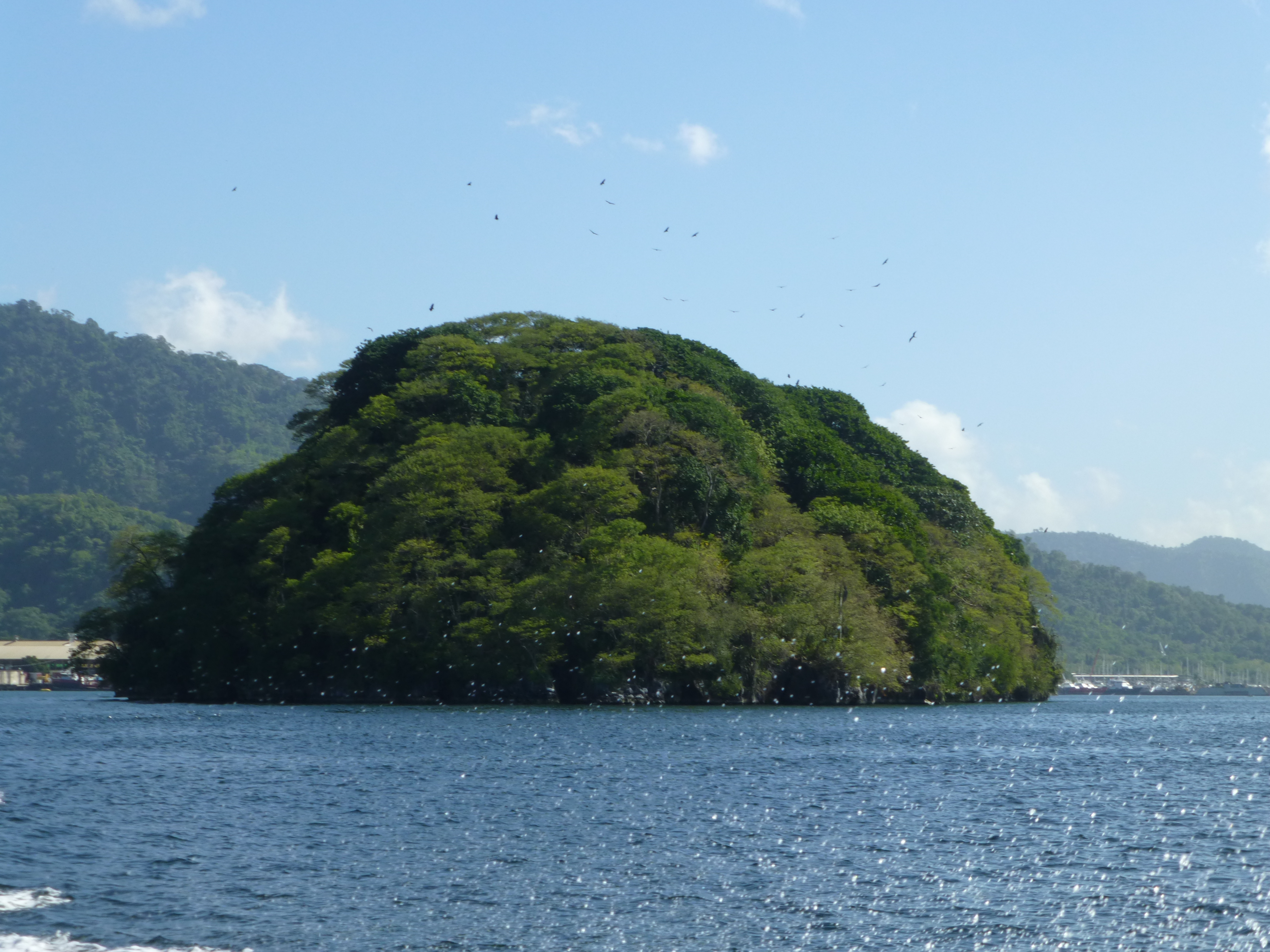
Gasparillo Island
