= Admiral Young =

Admiral Young may refer to:

- George Young (Royal Navy officer) (1732–1810), British Royal Navy admiral
- James Young (Royal Navy officer, born 1717) (1717–1789), British Royal Navy admiral
- James Young (Royal Navy officer, born 1762) (1762–1833), British Royal Navy vice admiral
- Lucien Young (1852–1912), U.S. Navy rear admiral
- William Young (Royal Navy officer, born 1751) (1751–1821), British Royal Navy admiral
- William Young (Royal Navy officer, born 1761) (1761–1847), British Royal Navy vice admiral

== See also ==
- Jonathan Young (commodore) (1826–1885), U.S. Navy commodore, preceding the use of the rank of admiral
