= James Young (Royal Navy officer, born 1717) =

Royal Navy Admiral (1717–1789)

Admiral James Young
- Born: 15 November 1717; London, England
- Died: 24 January 1789 (aged 71); London, England
- Burial place: St Anne's Church, Soho
- Relatives: James Young (son); William Young (son)
- Military career
- Allegiance: Great Britain
- Branch: Royal Navy
- Service years: 1737–1789
- Rank: Admiral of the White
- Commands: HMS Salamander; HMS Namur; HMS Kennington; HMS Dunkirk; HMS Jason; HMS Newark; HMS Intrepid; HMS Burford; HMS Mars; Leeward Islands Station
- Conflicts: War of the Austrian Succession; Seven Years' War; Battle of Minorca; Raid on Rochefort; Battle of Quiberon Bay; American War of Independence

James Young (15 November 1717 – 24 January 1789) was an officer of the Royal Navy who saw service during the War of the Austrian Succession, the Seven Years' War and the American War of Independence, rising to the rank of admiral of the white.

Young entered the navy as a midshipman and went out to the Mediterranean, where he would rise through the ranks during a long and extended cruise that saw him serve on a number of different vessels. A captain by the end of the War of the Austrian Succession, a fact that led to the caustic comment that he had been "midshipman, lieutenant, and captain in one voyage", he continued in active service after the war. He commanded several more ships during the Seven Years' War, and was one of those engaged at the controversial Battle of Minorca in 1756. The fleet's commander, Admiral John Byng, was court martialled over the affair, Young giving some damning evidence against Byng at the inquiry. Young also played a role in the more creditable performance at the Battle of Quiberon Bay in 1759, flying a broad pennant as a commodore and participating in the decisive defeat of the French fleet. He went on to command several squadrons on the French coast before his promotion to flag rank.

Young was back in active service during the American War of Independence, with the important posting as commander in chief of the Leeward Islands station. He acted to secure British trade from American warships and privateers, but was less successful at intercepting supplies of weapons and gunpowder being provided to the American rebels by the nominally neutral Dutch and French possessions in the Caribbean. His frustration mounted, especially after the Dutch island of St Eustatius fired the first salute to the American flag in 1776. He left the post in 1778, returning to England, where he entered retirement and died in 1789. He left a family, including two sons, William and James, who also became prominent naval officers.

== Family and early life ==
James Young was born on 15 November 1717, one of four sons of William Young, of Plymouth, Devon, and his wife Susannah, née Walker. James was baptised on 29 November 1717 at the church of St Martin in the Fields, Westminster. Through his great-uncle, the naval surgeon James Yonge, Young had a connection with the navy, and he began his career as a midshipman aboard the 50-gun HMS Gloucester in 1737, serving in the Mediterranean. The Gloucester was under the command of The Hon. George Clinton at the time, and on her return to England, Young remained in the Mediterranean, transferring to HMS Lancaster. He was promoted to lieutenant on 9 March 1739 and given command of the bomb vessel HMS Salamander in 1742. He was eventually transferred through a number of ships, becoming captain of the 90-gun HMS Namur on 16 May 1743, the flagship of Admiral Thomas Mathews. His appointment lasted only a few days, and later that month he was given command of the 20-gun HMS Kennington. After some time in command of the Kennington, by 1745 Young was in command of the 60-gun HMS Dunkirk. He remained during this period in the Mediterranean, only returning after the War of the Austrian Succession ended in 1748. His rise through the ranks during this period was archly commented on, with the observation that he had been "midshipman, lieutenant, and captain in one voyage".

== Seven Years' War ==
Young's active naval career continued after the war, and in February 1752 he commissioned the 44-gun HMS Jason, a former French ship that had been captured in 1747. From the Jason he moved to the 80-gun HMS Newark in 1755, though the appointment was a short one as by October 1755 he was in command of the 64-gun HMS Intrepid. He sailed to join the Mediterranean Fleet in April 1756, and was present with Admiral John Byng's fleet at the Battle of Minorca on 20 May 1756. Young in the Intrepid was the last ship of the van division during the engagement with the French fleet under the Marquis de La Galissonière. As Young entered the fight, French fire shot away the Intrepid's foretopmast. The battle ended in a controversial strategic defeat for the British, and at the subsequent inquiries, Byng claimed that the damage sustained by the Intrepid had caused disorder in the rear division of the fleet. Young was called upon to give evidence at Byng's court martial, and denied Byng's account. The evidence supplied by other officers supported Young.^{[a]}

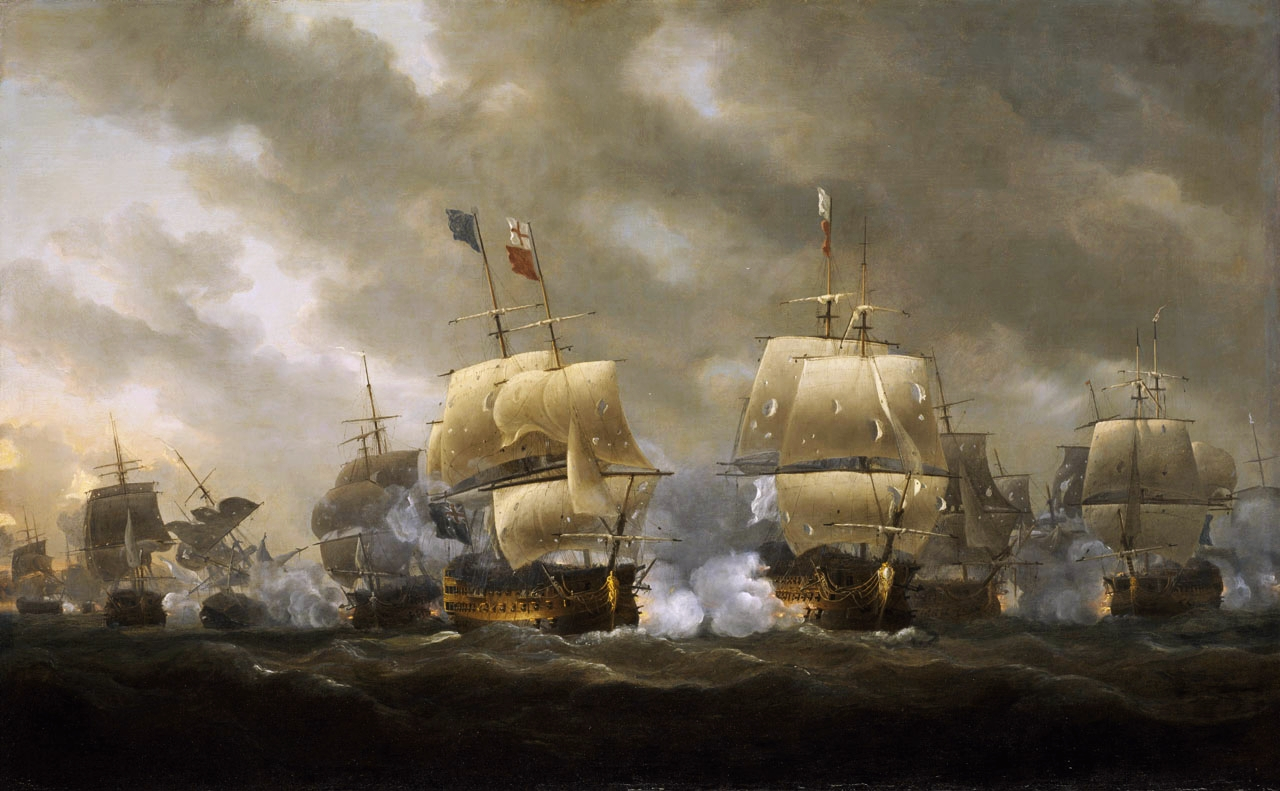
The Battle of Quiberon Bay, an 1812 work by Nicholas Pocock. Young flew a broad pennant while in command of HMS Mars during the battle.

Young remained in active service after the events at Minorca, and in April 1757 was in command of the 70-gun HMS Burford, part of the fleet sent under Edward Hawke to raid the French port of Rochefort in September that year. In March 1759 he took over command of the 74-gun HMS Mars, and was part of Hawke's fleet patrolling the French coast. He was appointed a commodore in the fleet, and flew his broad pennant aboard the Mars during the Battle of Quiberon Bay on 20 November 1759. The battle ended in a British victory over the French fleet commanded by the Comte de Conflans. Young went on to command a number of small squadrons in the Western Approaches to the English Channel, blockading the coast of Quiberon and the port of Brest.

== Flag rank ==
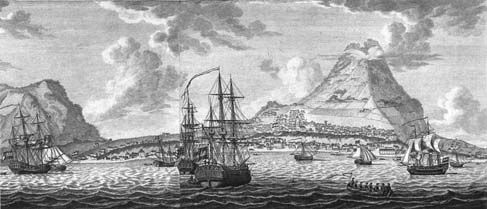
Historical engraving of the island of St Eustatius. Young struggled to cope with the open assistance provided by the nominally neutral Dutch to American forces during the American War of Independence.

Young was advanced to flag rank towards the end of the Seven Years' War, being promoted to rear-admiral on 21 October 1762. Further promotions followed, he attained the rank of vice-admiral on 28 October 1770, and became commander-in-chief in the Leeward Islands Station in April 1775. He raised his flag aboard the 50-gun HMS Portland and sailed to take up his post on 26 April. The American War of Independence broke out during Young's time in command, and he was tasked with using his small naval force to interdict the supply of arms and gunpowder to rebel forces, and to defend British trade from American privateers and warships. He struggled to combat the delivery of weapons to the Americans. His squadron had too few fast cruisers, and the Americans were being openly supplied from the neutral Caribbean possessions, from the Dutch-held St Eustatius and the French at Martinique. Frustrated, Young himself denounced the "very pernicious traffic carried on between his Britannic majesty's rebellious subjects ... and ... St. Eustatias." He was more successful though in ensuring British commerce remained secure, organizing convoy systems by mid-1776 to escort merchant ships to Britain, and cruising with some success against American privateers and warships. His squadron captured 205 American merchant ships and captured or destroyed seventeen American privateers and warships.

Young's anger with the Dutch at St. Eustatius was further provoked when the American brig Andrew Doria entered the Dutch port on 16 November 1776 and was greeted with an 11-gun salute by the guns of Fort Orange, the first foreign salute to the flag of the United States. Young wrote a furious letter to the governor, Johannes de Graaff, informing him of his

surprise and astonishment to hear it daily asserted in the most positive manner that the Port of St. Eustatius for some time past has been openly and avowedly declared Protector of all Americans and their vessels, whether in private trade or armed for offensive war. ... the colours and forts of the States General have been so far debased as to return the salute of these pirates and rebels and giving all manner of assistance of arms and ammunition and whatever else may enable them to annoy and disturb the trade of His Britannic Majesty's loyal and faithful subjects and even the Governor of St. Eustatius daily suffers privateers to be manned and armed and fitted in their port.

Young retaliated to the salute by blockading the island, though he was ordered to lift it in early 1777.

Young and other British officials knew they were running great risks, but when confronted with clandestine French and Dutch aid to the enemy, they could see no other way to prevent Americans from obtaining munitions than to disregard diplomatic and commercial niceties.

Further unable or unwilling to distinguish the local privateers from pirates, Young had a difficult period with the British settlers on the islands. The local authorities arrested him and brought legal proceedings against him and his officers. Privateers, strictly speaking were merchant ships, which were licensed by the authorities to attack enemy ships in time of war.

The problem was that those same privateers in peacetime were often engaged in acts of pure piracy or smuggling, which they continued in war but in the name of the King! Young would have got on better with the locals if he had turned a "Nelsonian blind eye." Young felt however that he had to stamp on them as apart from anything else he was finding it next to impossible to recruit local seamen and he feared desertion from his own ships to the better conditions and lure of money of the privateers. Further the privateers were all unlicensed so the navy had no control over them at all. The dispute was finally resolved when the local governors were empowered to license privateers, which brought some limited measure of control. In return the legal proceedings against James and his officers were dropped.

Young also ran into problems with local administrations in relation to rebel prisoners who soon after the war began to arrive on the British Caribbean Islands.

When prisoners arrived there during the early years of the war, the local merchants and plantation owners were unhappy. Late in 1776 Young burdened with 100 "Sickly" American prisoners on board his ships, tried to leave them on Antigua, but the island's government refused to take them, insisting that only the island's jail could hold them. With smallpox raging on Antigua, keeping the Americans in the jail there "would be delivering them over to almost certain death." The inmates' own diseases also would likely spread from the prison and infect the Antiguans.

Therefore, Antigua's government informed him that it was "unable" to cooperate with him. However Antigua and its fellow Caribbean colonies could not continue such a reluctant stance for long. The islands desperately required protection both from their huge numbers of slaves and from the French in the local jails.

Young also ran into problems with the Admiralty when he had tried to advance the interests of his son William who was serving under him. The letter below gives the flavour of the correspondence. In the end Young had to back down.

"Admiralty to Vice Admiral James Young Antigua 7 Augst [sic] 1776 Sir, I have received your letter of the zo" May enclosing the Commission you had signed for Lieut Wm Young to be Commander of the Pomona upon the Vacancies occasioned by the dismission of Captn Gordon from the Argo, and desiring for the reasons therein given, that it may be Confirm'd And having laid the same before my Lords, Comms of the Admty I have it in command from their Lordships to acquaint you that they do not think fit to depart from the Resolution which Mr Jackson In his letter of the 20th Feby informed you that they had come to upn that matter and I am farther to acquaint you that as by the appointment of Lieut Windsor to be 1 st lieutenant of the Portland, Lieut Young ought to have succeeded him as 2nd Lieut of that Ship, the Commissions you have given to Lieut Swinney to be 2nd and Lieut Drummond to be the 3rd Lieuts of her and Mr Luck to be 2nd Lieut of the Argo in the room of Lieut Drummond, being irregular, cannot be confirmed, and that if Lieut Young does not think proper to take a Commissioned; as 2nd Lieut of the Portland which as 1 have observed be ought to have had, their Lordships will fill up the vacancy's that may be occasioned thereby, and send out Commission's for that purpose, when they hear farther from you, I have the honor to be etc."

Further promotions followed during his time in command in the West Indies, and on 29 January 1778 he was promoted to admiral of the white. Contemporary chroniclers recorded that he had raised his flag aboard HMS Aurora in February that year, but his time as the station commander was drawing to a close. He returned to England in July 1778, and had no further active seagoing service.

Though professionally difficult the appointment was personally rewarding for it seems that Young became quite rich whilst in the Leeward Islands. Charnock’s Biographica Navalis published in 1797 contains the following.

“He [Young] appears to have been singularly alert and met with a very considerable share of success in the capture of a multitude of vessels, many of them of no inconsiderable value”

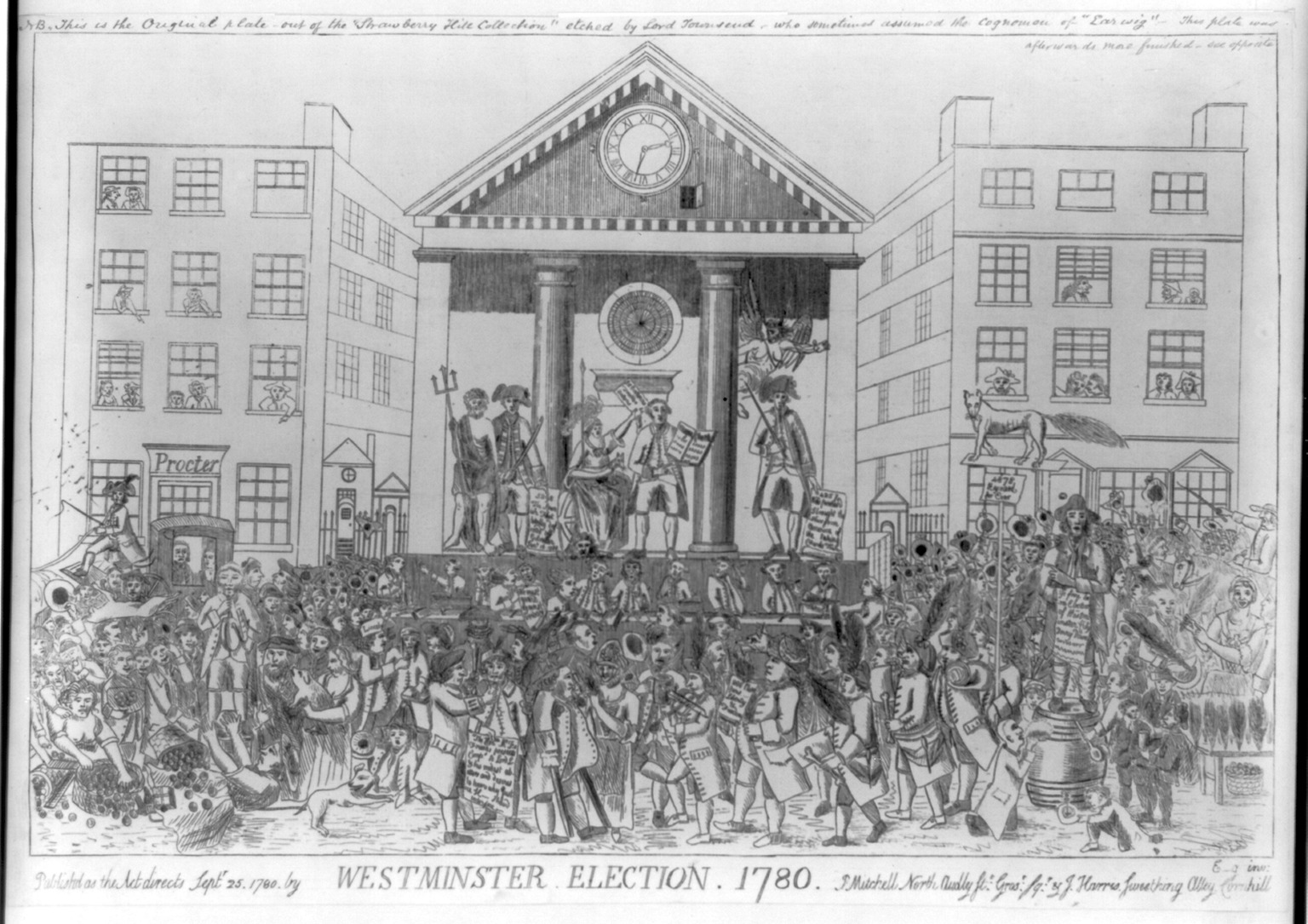
Print shows Lord Lincoln standing on the right of St. Paul's portico, Charles James Fox standing in the center with Britannia and the British lion, and on the left, James Young, acting as proxy for Admiral Rodney, with Neptune, during the Westminster election of 1780

== Later life, family and issue ==
Young appears to have entered retirement, settling in London, and dying there on 24 January 1789. He had been twice married. He married his first wife, Elizabeth Bolton, in Gibraltar in 1747. The couple had one son, William, who rose to be a prominent naval officer, and four daughters, Philippa, Susan, Elizabeth, and Sophia. His first wife died, and towards the end of 1762 James married Sophia Vasmer, the daughter of the merchant John Henry Vasmer. The couple had two children together, a son, James, who also became a senior naval officer, and a daughter, Charlotte. A further son, Thomas, may have been born out of wedlock. Admiral James Young was buried at St Anne's Church, Soho, on 2 February 1789.

== Notes ==
a. There was public uproar over Byng's conduct, which led to the loss of Minorca. Byng was convicted of having failed to do his "utmost to take or destroy the enemy's ships", and was sentenced to death. King George II declined to intervene, and Byng was duly executed.

== Citations ==
Military offices
Preceded by William Parry	Commander-in-Chief, Leeward Islands Station; 1775–1778	Succeeded by Samuel Barrington
