= Flag of Sint Eustatius =

Sint Eustatius
- Use: National flag
- Proportion: 2:3
- Adopted: 29 July 2004; 22 years ago
- Design: Four colours blue, red, white, gold and green, and divided in four five-sided blue polygons, each fimbriated red. In its centre is a diamond-form white field; in the diamond is the silhouette of the island in green. In the centre in the top of the diamond is a five-pointed golden/yellow star.
- Designed by: Zuwena Suares

The flag of the Caribbean Netherlands island of Sint Eustatius (Statia) consists of a blue field, red fimbriations, and in the center, a white diamond with a silhouette of the island. The flag was designed by Zuwena Suares and adopted on 29 July 2004 to be put into use on 16 November of that year (Statia Day). Since 2010, it has been the official flag of the special municipality of Sint Eustatius.

== Description ==
The flag is rectangular, in proportions of 2:3, with the colors blue, red, white, gold and green, and divided in four five-sided blue polygons, each fimbriated red. In its center is a diamond-form white field; in the diamond is the silhouette of the island in green. In the center in the top of the diamond is a five-pointed golden/yellow star. (Note: The island's flag law refers to both the color "gold/yellow" (goud/geel) and "a golden star" (een gouden ster).)

The colours of the flag each have their own meaning. The gold star represents unity, the four blue polygons represent the ocean that surrounds St. Eustasius, the Green shows the Quill, a volcano also known as Mount Mazinga, the red represents the Delonix regia, a flamboyant tree which was used by slaves to celebrate Emancipation Day, and the white diamond in the center represents a once diamond water fall which is referred to in the national anthem, "Golden Rock".

== Island Ordinance ==
Island ordinance gives strict rules on how to raise and lower the flag. It states also that anyone who intentionally destroys a Sint Eustatius flag may be punished by up to two months in jail, or a fine of up to 5000 guilders, although the currency was replaced in 2024 by the US dollar.
