= William Young (Royal Navy officer, born 1761) =

Royal Navy officer (1761–1847)

Vice-Admiral William Young
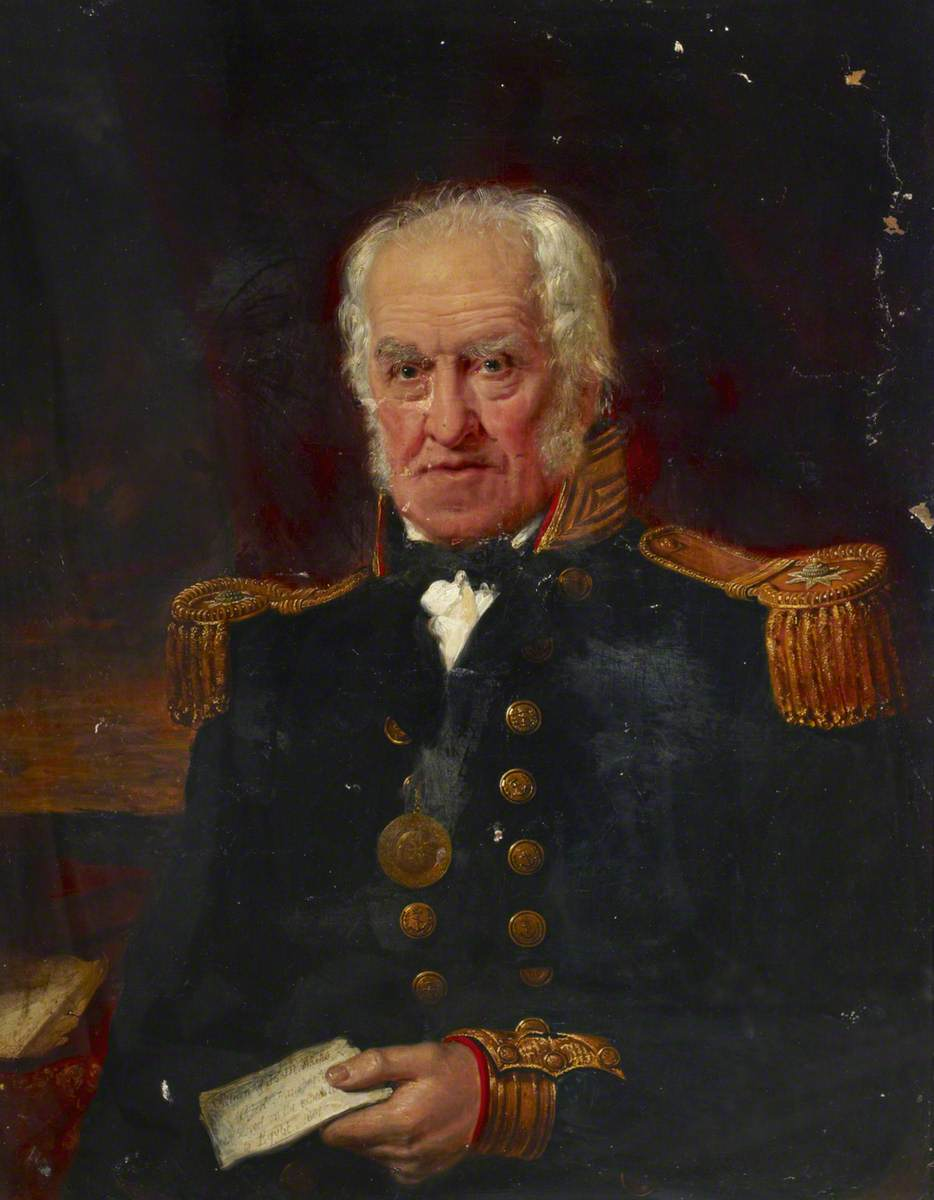
- Born: 27 August 1761; Borrowstoness, Scotland
- Died: 11 February 1847 (aged 85); Denmark Hill, Camberwell, Surrey
- Military career
- Allegiance: United Kingdom of Great Britain and Ireland
- Branch: Royal Navy
- Service years: 1777 – 1847
- Rank: Vice-Admiral of the Blue
- Conflicts: American Revolutionary War; French Revolutionary Wars; Napoleonic Wars
- Awards: Order of the Crescent

William Young (27 August 1761 – 11 February 1847) was an officer of the Royal Navy who saw service during the American War of Independence, and the French Revolutionary and Napoleonic Wars. He should not be confused with his namesake and near contemporary Vice Admiral William Young.

He served on several ships during the American War of Independence, rising steadily through the ranks. With the outbreak of war with Revolutionary France he was first engaged in recruiting seamen for the service, after which he became involved in the transport and logistics side of naval warfare, which was to remain his forte for the rest of his career. His service in the West Indies, in home waters and in the Mediterranean brought him to the attention of influential army and navy leaders, who helped him to find postings and be promoted. He mixed with royalty, garnering accolades for his services, and enjoyed the friendship of kings and dukes. Advanced to flag rank in the years after the end of the war, he fathered a large family, and died in 1847 after seventy years of naval service, and with the rank of Vice-Admiral of the blue.

== Family and early life ==
Young was born in Borrowstoness, Scotland on 27 August 1761, the second son of David Young. William Young entered the navy on 16 May 1777 as an able seaman aboard the 50-gun HMS Portland, under Captain Thomas Dumaresq. The Portland was at this time the flagship of Vice-Admiral James Young, commanding in the Leeward Islands. Young was advanced to midshipman during his time on the Portland, and moved to the tender to the 32-gun HMS Tartar. Here he participated in the capture of over 50 vessels, including several privateers of superior force. Young was then briefly aboard the 74-gun HMS Canada, based at Chatham under Captain Hugh Dalrymple, before returning to his old captain, Thomas Dumaresq, in May 1779 as master's mate aboard HMS Ulysses, a frigate armed en flûte and serving in home waters and in the West Indies.

After leaving the Ulysses, Young served aboard the 64-gun HMS Ruby, the flagship of Sir Peter Parker at Jamaica, before being promoted to an acting-lieutenancy on 5 February 1781.^{[a]} He went on to serve aboard HMS Nestor, carrying the flag of Rear-Admiral Joshua Rowley, and then aboard the 32-gun HMS Fox under Captains the Honourable Thomas Windsor, Robert Montagu, and George Stoney. During this time he was sent to Jamaica in charge of a Spanish privateer captured near St. Domingo, and in February 1783 took part in a short action in which Fox captured the Spanish frigate Santa Catalina, with the loss of four men killed and one wounded aboard Fox.

== French Revolutionary Wars ==
With the outbreak of war with Revolutionary France, Young was at first engaged in raising upwards of 1000 seamen through voluntary subscriptions from the merchants, bankers, and others of the city of London, and in December 1794 he joined the navy's Transport department. He was the Principal Agent overseeing the embarking of the troops and civilians during the evacuation of Port-au-Prince in May 1798, where his services brought him to the attention of Brigadier-General Thomas Maitland. Maitland recommended he be promoted to Acting-Commander, and Young received confirmation of the promotion on 3 July 1799. In October he was put in charge of the transports in the Downs and Ramsgate and took them to the Texel, after which, in July 1800 he oversaw the embarkation of troops for the expedition to Ferrol, which he accompanied as Principal Agent. Young was appointed by Lord Keith to serve on his flagship, HMS Foudroyant, on 17 November 1800. He was made captain of the fleet and given the task of overseeing the details of the shipping assembled at Port Mahon for the expedition to Egypt. Young went to Egypt with the expeditionary force, but became ill with repeated bilious attacks and was forced to return to Britain in June 1801.

His service in the Mediterranean was noticed and praised by Sir Ralph Abercromby and Lord Keith, and on their recommendations Young was advanced to Post-rank on 29 April 1802. He was presented with the gold medal of the Turkish Order of the Crescent and received a gold-hilted sword from the masters of the ships of the expedition.

== Napoleonic Wars ==
With the resumption of hostilities in 1803 Young was sent to Hanover by Lord St. Vincent to provide an escort to the Dukes of Cambridge and Gloucester. He was then employed under Rear-Admiral James Hawkins-Whitshed in fitting out gun-vessels at Dublin, embarking troops at Cork, and establishing signal-posts on the south-west coast of Ireland, in preparation for a threatened French invasion. In October 1805 Young became the Inspecting Agent for Transports on the Thames, a post he held for the next 25 years, until his retirement in February 1830. During his time in the post he became friends with King William IV, and the Dukes of York, Kent, Cambridge and Gloucester. On his retirement the different Transport-Lieutenants who had served under him presented him with a silver vase.

== Later life ==
Young was advanced to rear-admiral on the retired list on 10 January 1837, and was restored to the active list on 17 August 1840. He was promoted to vice-admiral on 9 November 1846. Young had married Ann Spencer on 15 February 1789, with the union producing 13 children. His eldest son, William Hall Young, followed his father into the navy, and served as a midshipman in the West Indies, but died at Plymouth in October 1809. His second son, George Frederick Young, was MP for Tynemouth and North Shields between 1832 and 1837. Young died at Denmark Hill, Camberwell, Surrey on 11 February 1847, after spending 70 years in the navy.

== Notes ==
a. O'Byrne has the acting-lieutenancy accompanied with a posting to a 50-gun ship named Gratton. No ship of this name appears in J. J. Colledge's Ships of the Royal Navy, nor Rif Winfield's British Warships in the Age of Sail: 1714-1792. This may be HMS Grafton, which was in the West Indies at the time, though she was a 74-gun ship.
