= Statia Day =

National holiday on Sint Eustatius

- Observed by: Sint Eustatius
- Type: National
- Date: 16 November

Statia Day is a national holiday celebrated in the Caribbean island of Sint Eustatius, a special municipality of the Kingdom of the Netherlands. It celebrates "The First Salute", when Sint Eustatius (known locally as Statia) became the first country to recognize the United States. On 16 November 1776, the Continental Navy ship Andrew Doria fired a salute upon entering the harbor in Sint Eustatius, customary for ships entering a foreign port. A few minutes later, by order of Johannes de Graaff, the Dutch Governor, guns from the island’s Fort Oranje returned the salute.
