= HMS Mars (1759) =

Ship of the line of the Royal Navy

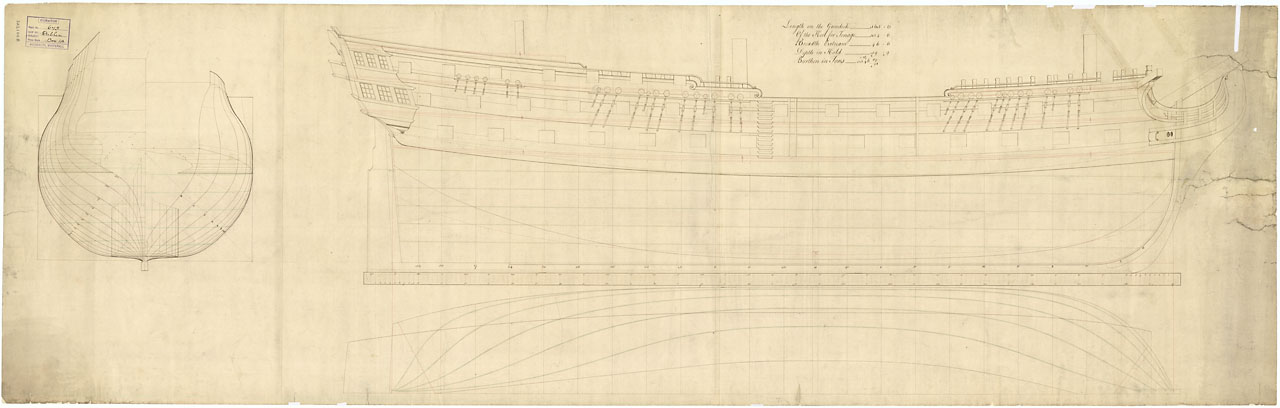
- Mars

History

Great Britain
- Name: HMS Mars
- Ordered: 17 November 1755
- Builder: Woolwich Dockyard
- Laid down: 1 May 1756
- Launched: 15 March 1759
- Commissioned: 12 April 1759
- Honours and awards: Participated in: Battle of Quiberon Bay
- Fate: Sold to be broken up, August 1784

General characteristics
- Class & type: Dublin-class ship of the line
- Tons burthen: 155610/94 (bm)
- Length: 165 ft 6 in (50.44 m) (gundeck)
- Beam: 46 ft 6 in (14.17 m)
- Depth of hold: 19 ft 9 in (6.02 m)
- Propulsion: Sails
- Sail plan: Full-rigged ship
- Armament: 74 guns: Gundeck: 28 × 32 pdrs; Upper gundeck: 28 × 18 pdrs; Quarterdeck: 14 × 9 pdrs; Forecastle: 4 × 9 pdrs

HMS Mars was a 74-gun third rate ship of the line of the Royal Navy, launched on 15 March 1759 at Woolwich Dockyard.

Mars took part in the Battle of Quiberon Bay on 20 November 1759, flying the broad pennant of Commodore James Young.

From 1778, Mars was on harbour service, and was broken up in 1784.
