= Isaak Faesch =

Swiss merchant (1687–1758)

Isaak Faesch, also known as Isaac Fäsch (4 September 1687 – 13 October 1758), was a Swiss merchant, slave trader, mercenary, and colonial administrator for the Dutch West India Company. He served as governor of Sint Eustatius, Saba and Sint Maarten from 1737 to 1740 and of Curaçao and Dependencies from 1740 until his death.

== Life ==
Faesch was born on 4 September 1687 in Basel into the patrician Faesch family. He was the youngest of ten children of Johann Jacob Faesch, a town clerk, member of the Key Guild, and deputy of churches and schools (born 30 August 1638, in Basel; died 16 May 1706, in the same city), and his wife Ursula (born 28 March 1647, in Basel; died 2 September 1708), daughter of Basel mayor Andreas Burckhardt (1604–1667). His great-grandfather was the mayor of Basel, Johann Rudolf Faesch (1572–1659), and his brother-in-law was the later mayor of Basel, Andreas Burckhardt (1652–1731).

He married Eleonora Martin in Basel, with the ceremony conducted remotely from Curaçao. After completing a commercial apprenticeship, Faesch began a career as a mercenary during the War of the Spanish Succession; he served under Marshal Louis-François de Boufflers in France and as aide-de-camp to Prince Eugene of Savoy in Austria, and later entered Dutch service, achieving the rank of major. He resigned in 1713 after the Peace of Utrecht and joined his brother Johann Rudolf Faesch's (died 1718) trading company in Amsterdam, which was involved in overseas trade with the West Indies. After his brother's death, he continued to run the trading company with his brother's widow, Johanna (née Sprenger). The company went bankrupt in 1720 during the South Sea and Mississippi speculative bubbles, and Isaak Faesch was forced to flee. His claims for debts totaling over 2 million guilders against the Frankfurt banking house of Johann Martin de Ron (1645–1722) were largely dismissed.

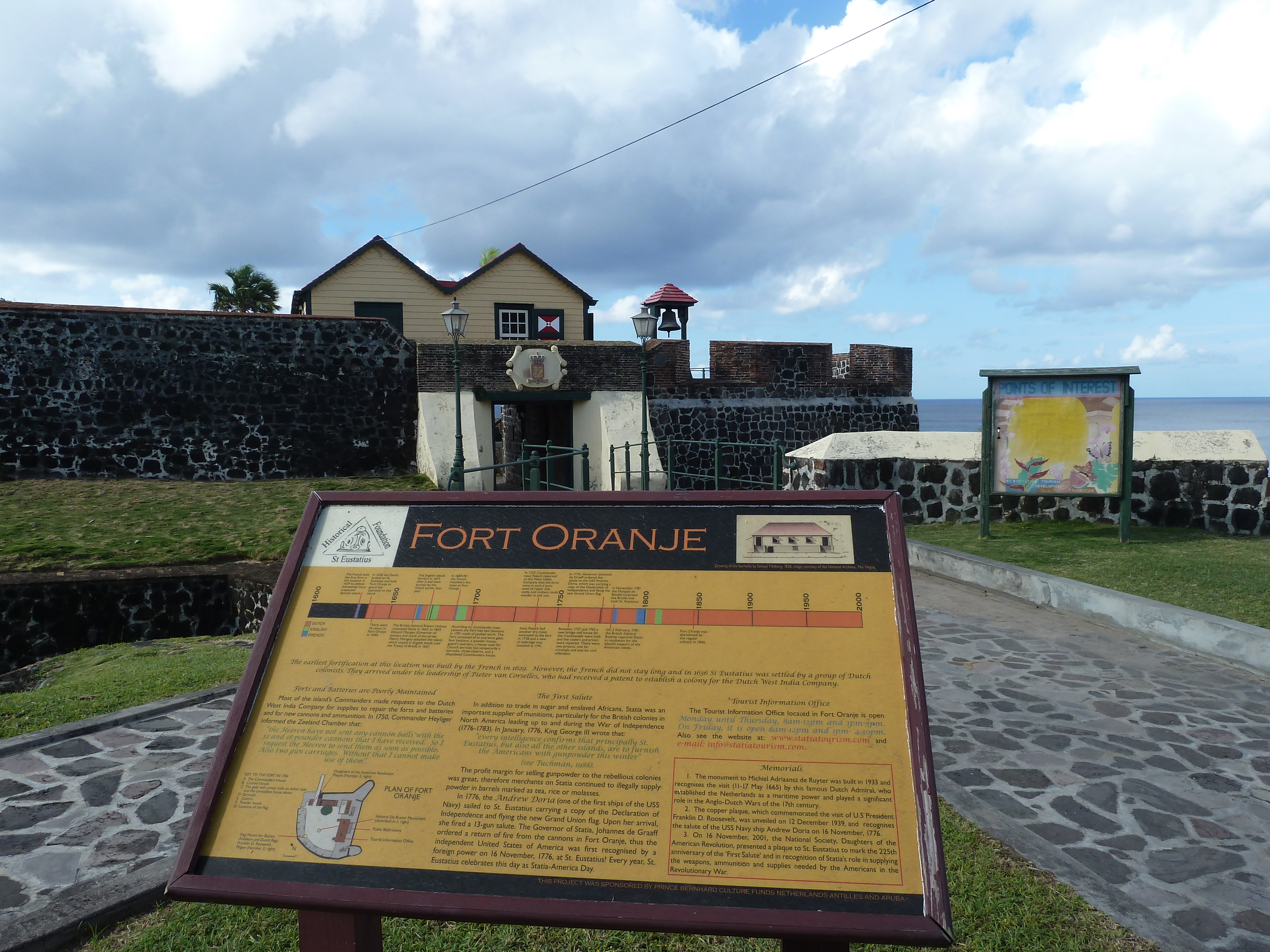
Fort Oranje

In the years that followed, Faesch entered the service of the Dutch West India Company (GWC) and was appointed governor of Sint Eustatius in 1735, arriving there in 1736 after a six-month voyage. He and his trading partner Johann Jacob Hoffmann from Basel were involved in the trade of European linen, cotton, silk fabrics, and silk yarns, both as commission agents for merchants in Amsterdam, Haarlem, and Leiden, and on their own account in the Caribbean islands and mainland Spain. They exported sugar, coffee, tobacco, cocoa, dye woods, ginger, and copaiba oil to other European countries and were involved in the ship insurance business as brokers. After the Dutch prohibited Faesch from trading, Johann Jakob Hoffmann continued the commercial activities. A preserved letter copy book of the two, containing around 400 pages of copies of 279 letters written in French and Dutch, from 5 August 1740 to 22 May 1742, provides insight into this area. During his tenure on Sint Eustatius, Faesch had a drawbridge built at Fort Oranje in Oranjestad and succeeded in suppressing a rebellion on the island of Sint Maarten, reinstating the ousted governor, John Philips.

In 1740, Faesch became governor of the Caribbean island of Curaçao, along with the subordinate islands of Aruba and Bonaire, the GWC's hub for the slave trade with the American continent and for smuggling English, Spanish, and French products from North and South America and the Lesser Antilles. From the beginning of his term, the colony suffered from a labor shortage, prompting him to request reinforcements for the local slave market from Amsterdam. However, he also freed older slaves through manumission proceedings. In matters of private trade, he mediated internal conflicts among the island's colonial elite and curbed disputes within the Jewish community in Curaçao with a military presence, harsh sanctions, and permission to build a second synagogue.

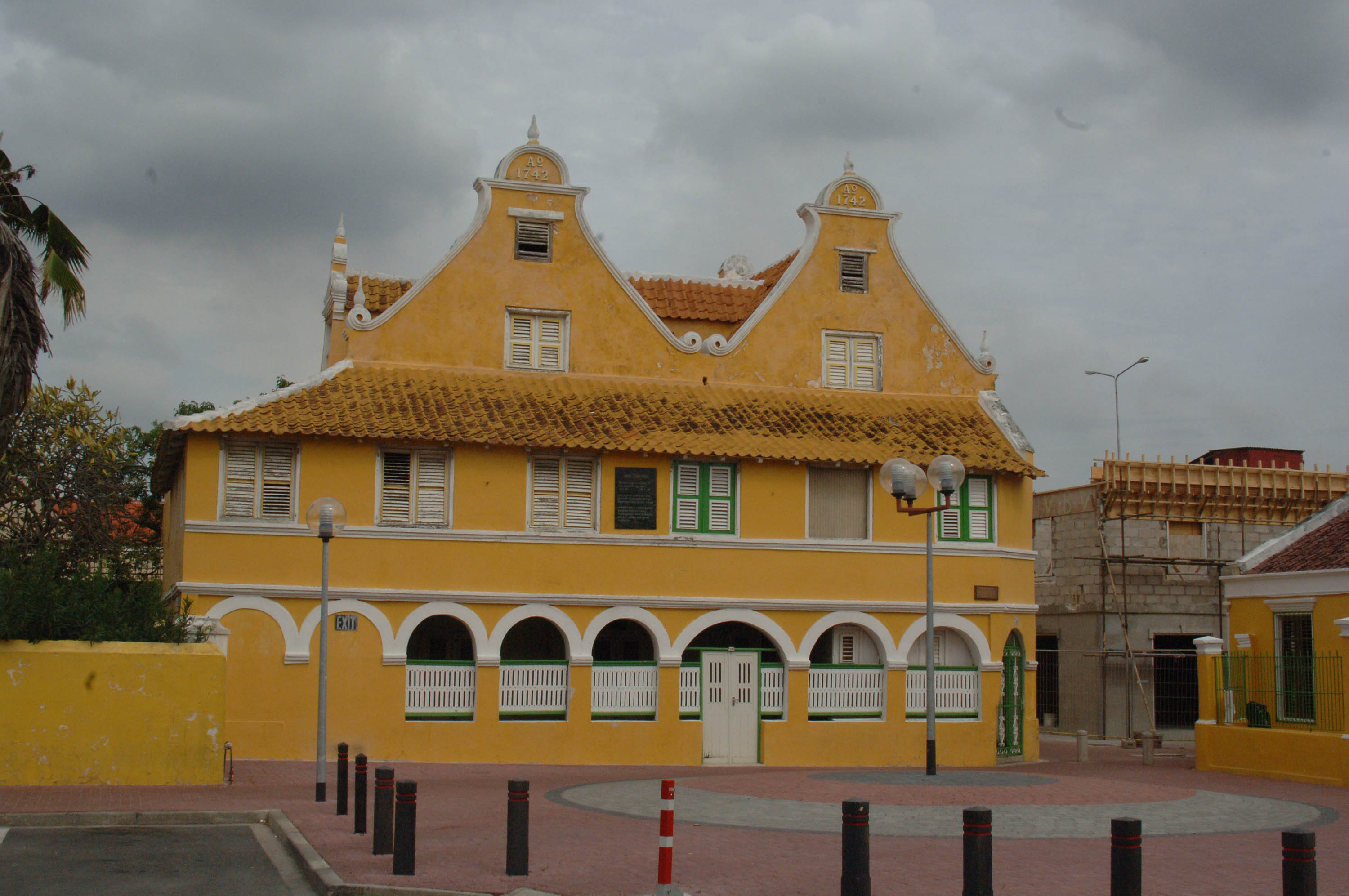
Isaak Faesch's residence in Willemsted, Curaçao

Faesch managed the Hato plantation, where he owned enslaved people and enforced harsher corporal punishment. As governor, he reinstated punishments such as flogging, branding with hot irons, and banishment to the salt flats of Bonaire in 1745 to maintain public order. In 1750, a revolt by newly arrived slaves from Fort Elmina on the west coast of Africa, controlled by the GWC, was violently suppressed with the help of a local militia of whites, mulattos, and freed slaves. On Faesch's orders, 47 enslaved people were executed, including 30 men and women from his own estate. The executed were beheaded, their heads displayed on stakes at the harbor, and their bodies burned.

Several of his nephews came to Curaçao as merchants, including Johann Jakob Faesch in 1756 and 1758 on behalf of the Faesch & van Hoven company.

Faesch died at his home at Sebastopolstraat 26–28 in Willemstad, Curaçao without direct descendants, leaving a fortune of 121,000 guilders, which his family members in Basel inherited under Dutch law. The settlement of the estate took nearly ten years. Emanuel Faesch was the only surviving brother. His sons, Johann Jakob Faesch, managed the estate, with goods transferred to Amsterdam and sold at public auction.

== Memberships ==
In 1745, Faesch purchased membership in the Basel gentlemen's guild Safranzunft as a pants maker in absentia.
