= William Young (Royal Navy officer, born 1751) =

Royal Navy Admiral (1751–1821)

Admiral Sir William Young GCB
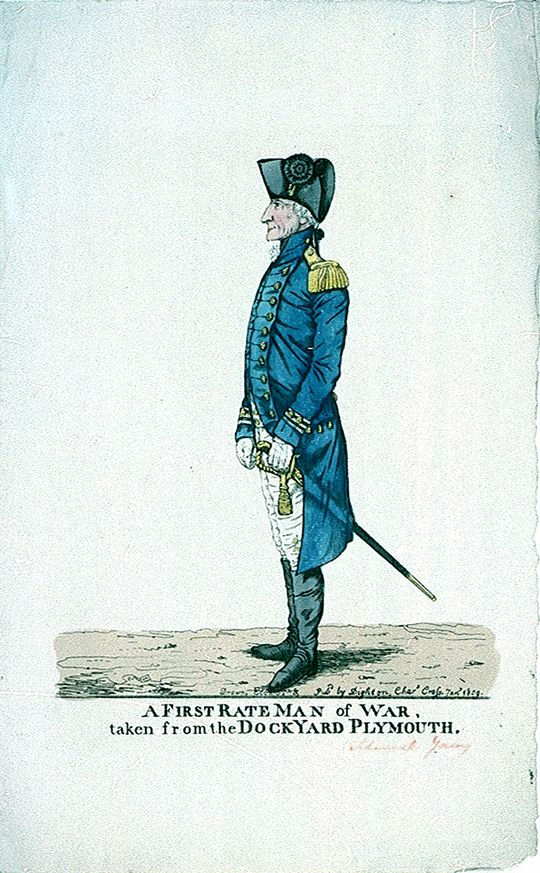
- A First Rate Man of War, taken from the Dockyard Plymouth, an 1809 caricature of William Young while commander at Plymouth, by Robert Dighton
- Born: 16 August 1751
- Died: 25 October 1821 (aged 70); Queen Anne Street, London
- Relatives: James Young (father); James Young (half-brother)
- Military career
- Allegiance: United Kingdom
- Branch: Royal Navy
- Service years: 1761 – 1821
- Rank: Admiral of the Red
- Commands: HMS Snake; HMS Hind; HMS Ambuscade; HMS Perseverance; HMS Crescent; HMS Fortitude; Plymouth Command
- Conflicts: French Revolutionary Wars; Siege of Toulon; Battle of Genoa; Battle of Hyères Islands
- Awards: Knight Grand Cross of the Order of the Bath

Admiral Sir William Young GCB (16 August 1751 – 25 October 1821) was an officer of the Royal Navy who saw service during the American War of Independence, and the French Revolutionary and Napoleonic Wars. He should not be confused with his namesake and near contemporary Admiral William Young.

Young was born into a naval family, with his father, James Young, and his half-brother, James Young also serving in the navy and rising to flag rank. William Young served on a variety of ships and rose to his own commands during the American War of Independence. Using his connections to continue in service during the years of peace, he was almost immediately given command of a ship on the outbreak of the wars with the France and served initially in the Mediterranean during the siege of Toulon, at the reduction of Corsica, and at the battles of Genoa and Hyères Islands. Promoted to flag rank soon after these events, he returned to England and joined the Board of Admiralty.

He rose through the ranks during his time in office, serving in his official capacity during the Spithead and Nore mutinies, as commander at Plymouth, and as senior officer during the court martial of Lord Gambier after the Battle of the Basque Roads. He returned to an active command at sea in 1811 with responsibility for blockading the Dutch coast until the end of the war. He received further promotions, and reached the rank of Admiral of the Red, with the position of Vice-Admiral of the United Kingdom before his death in 1821.

== Family and early life ==
Young was born on 16 August 1751, the eldest of five children of James Young, himself a distinguished naval officer who rose to the rank of admiral, and his wife Elizabeth. Elizabeth died sometime before 1762, and his father married Sophia Vasmer, having at least two children. The eldest son by his second marriage, James, also embarked on a naval career and became a rear-admiral of the blue. William Young entered the navy in April 1761, joining the 50-gun HMS Guernsey under Captain Mark Milbanke as captain's servant. He joined the 8-gun HMS Wasp in December 1762, but rejoined Guernsey in October 1764. The Guernsey was by now under Commodore Hugh Palliser. Young took and passed his lieutenant's examination on 10 January 1769, and received his promotion on 12 November 1770 with a posting to the 16-gun HMS Nautilus, which was then at Plymouth.

He joined the 64-gun HMS Trident, which was then in the Mediterranean as the flagship of Sir Peter Denis, as her fourth lieutenant. He served aboard her for several years, until becoming third lieutenant of the 50-gun HMS Portland on 23 January 1775. The Portland was at the time his father's flagship, at the Leeward Islands. Service in the American War of Independence created opportunities for aspiring young officers, and he received his first command, that of the sloop HMS Snake, on 10 May 1777. The post was confirmed on 23 September 1778, and the same day he was again promoted and made captain of the 24-gun HMS Hind. He moved to take over the 32-gun HMS Ambuscade on 15 April 1782, and remained with her until the end of the war. He remained on active service during the peace, surviving the drawdown of the navy to be given command the 36-gun HMS Perseverance in October 1787. He then briefly commanded the 36-gun HMS Crescent from 10 May until November 1790.

== French Revolutionary Wars ==
As war with Revolutionary France approached, the navy expanded, and on 31 January 1793 Young was given command of the 74-gun HMS Fortitude. He took Fortitude out to the Mediterranean to join the fleet under Lord Hood, where he took part in the occupation and siege of Toulon. With the fall of the city to the republicans, Hood decided to establish a base at Corsica. He sent a squadron under Commodore Robert Linzee, and consisting of three ships of the line and two frigates, with troops under Major-General David Dundas, to Mortella Bay.^{[a]} The troops were landed on 7 February 1794, and on 9 February Fortitude and Juno were sent to bombard a tower, just south of Pointe de la Mortella. Capturing the tower was necessary to secure the bay, but it proved highly resistant to bombardment, and despite only being armed with one 24-pounder gun, inflicted heavy damage on the British ships. After two hours of bombardment Fortitude had been nearly set on fire by hot shot, and was forced to retreat with six men killed and fifty-six wounded.^{[b]}

== Flag rank and the Board of Admiralty ==
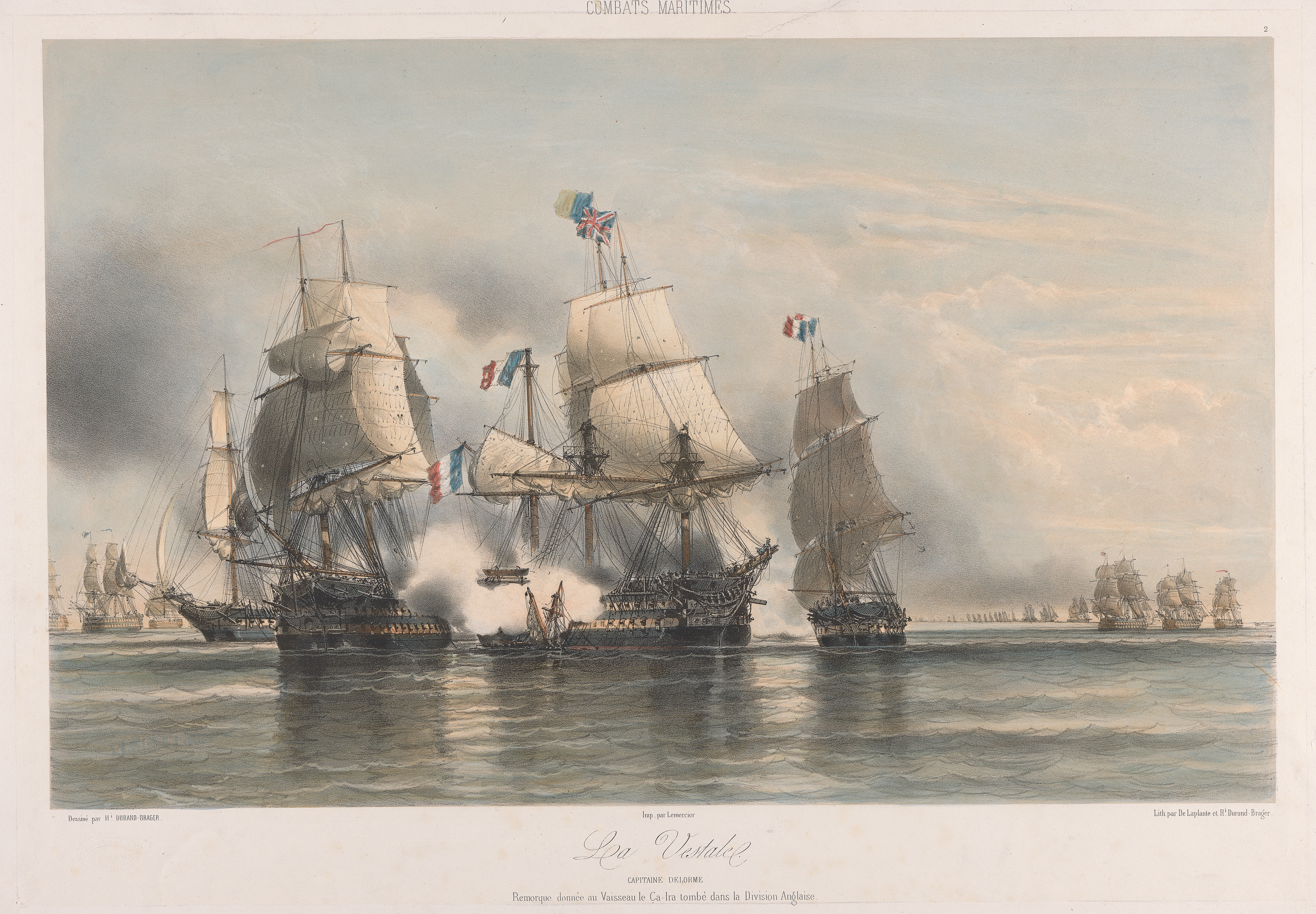
The French ship Ça Ira depicting fighting during the Battle of Genoa

Young continued to serve with Hood's forces, and was active in the sieges of Bastia and Calvi, being awarded the honorary rank of colonel of marines on 4 July 1794. He was present with the fleet at the Battle of Genoa on 14 March 1795 and the Battle of Hyères Islands on 13 July 1795 under Vice-Admiral Sir William Hotham. He had been advanced to the rank of rear admiral of the white on 1 June 1795, and returned to England in autumn that year escorting a convoy. He joined the Board of Admiralty on 20 November, serving as one of the Lords Commissioners until 19 February 1801. He visited Spithead in April 1797, during the mutiny there, as part of the committee of conciliation sent by the board. Though professionally Young maintained the official line on the events, privately he appears to have been somewhat sympathetic to the seamen's complaints, and in a letter to Captain Charles Morice Pole remarked that ‘a sad want of energy and of particular attention to duty which the government of large bodies of men requires especially in these times and an absent or indifferent man can produce incalculable mischief’. Consequently, during his tenure at the Admiralty he tried to improve conditions and tighten discipline.

== Command at Plymouth ==
Young attended the thanksgiving service for the recent naval victories at St Paul's Cathedral late in 1797.^{[c]} He was promoted to vice-admiral of the blue on 14 February 1799, the second anniversary of Sir John Jervis's victory at the Battle of St Vincent, and was further advanced to vice-admiral of the white on 1 January 1801. He was promoted to vice-admiral of the red on 23 April 1804, and on 18 May was appointed Commander-in-Chief, Plymouth. His time at Plymouth was marked with conflict with a junior officer, Lord Cochrane, who accused Young of excessive greed in the matter of prize money, but this was a common dispute between officers, and Young followed common naval practice in his orders. He was advanced to admiral of the blue on 9 November 1805, but had been suffering ill health and fatigue during his posting and stepped down from his post in 1807. He declined the offer to lead the expedition to the Baltic in 1807, and instead the position was given to Sir James Gambier. He continued in his post as Commander-in-Chief, Plymouth for several more years.

=== Gambier's court martial ===
Young was later appointed the senior admiral at the board of the court martial held against Gambier in July 1809, to investigate Gambier's actions at the Battle of the Basque Roads. Gambier's principle critic was Lord Cochrane, who went on to accuse Young of undue bias in Gambier's favour, but Cochrane had already clashed with Young over the matter of prize money, and had accused Young of inefficiency in outfitting ships during his time at Plymouth when Cochrane was MP for Westminster. Young did object to Cochrane's discursive answers during the court martial, but does not seem to have been any more hostile than the other members of the board.

Young was advanced to admiral of the white on 31 July 1810 and in spring 1811 he became Commander-in-Chief, North Sea. His task was to blockade the Dutch fleet, and he hoisted his flag aboard the 83-gun HMS Christian VII on his arrival at the Downs on 26 April. The fleet was in good order to carry out the blockade, though afflicted by shortages of men. Young had the support of the First Lord of the Admiralty, Charles Philip Yorke, though the blockade proved an arduous task, consisted of constant cruises, with shortages of ships, men and supplies, and the problems of bad weather. He hoped to lure the French fleet out of Flushing, but the French declined to come out. He hoped to be given command of the Channel Fleet, but when the appointment was given to Lord Keith in February 1812, Young felt he had been undermined, and resigned. Yorke persuaded him to return to his command, which he held until the end of the war. He was invested a Knight Companion of the Bath on 28 July 1814, and with the reconstruction of the order the following year, became a Knight Grand Cross of the Order of the Bath on 2 January 1815.

== Later years ==
Young became deputy present of the Naval Charitable Society, and Rear-Admiral of the United Kingdom on 14 May 1814. He was made Vice-Admiral of the United Kingdom on 18 July 1819 after the death of Sir William Cornwallis, but by now was troubled by his failing health, and spent November 1818 at Bath. He died, aged 70, at his house in Queen Anne Street, North London, on 25 October 1821 after a short illness.

== Assessment ==
Admiral Sir William Hotham described Young during his time at the Admiralty as being ‘diligent in application, clear in method and generally informed’. Young's biographer, P. K. Crimmin described his command of the Dutch blockade as being 'well performed and praiseworthy', while describing him as a 'conventional upholder and representative of the existing naval social order, though aware of the need for some reform and having some sympathy with seamen's grievances.' His opposition to Cochrane's radicalism and insubordinate attitude to superior officers led to him being harshly criticised by Cochrane's admirers, such as Captain Frederick Marryat, who included him in his novel Frank Mildmay as 'Sir Hurricane Humbug'. Sir William Hotham instead declared that his manners 'tho' rather formal and cold, were those of a perfect gentleman, while he had the most punctilious sense of integrity'.

== Notes ==
a. The ships were three 74-gun third rates; HMS Alcide, carrying Linzee's broad pennant and under Captain Woodley, HMS Egmont under J. Dickson, and Fortitude under Young. Accompanying them were the 32-gun frigates HMS Juno and HMS Lowestoffe, under Captains Samuel Hood and William Wolsey respectively.

b. The tower eventually fell to land-based forces under Sir John Moore after two days of heavy fighting. The effectiveness of the tower, when properly supplied and defended, impressed the British, who copied the design for what they would call Martello towers.

c. The victories commemorated were Lord Howe's at the Glorious First of June, Sir John Jervis's at St Vincent, and Adam Duncan's at Camperdown.

== Citations ==
Military offices
Preceded by Sir John Colpoys	Commander-in-Chief, Plymouth; 1804–1810	Succeeded by Sir Robert Calder
Preceded by Sir Edward Pellew	Commander-in-Chief, North Sea; 1811–1815	Succeeded by Post disbanded
Honorary titles
Preceded by Sir William Cornwallis	Rear-Admiral of the United Kingdom; 1814–1819	Succeeded by James Saumarez, 1st Baron de Saumarez
Preceded by Sir William Cornwallis	Vice-Admiral of the United Kingdom; 1819–1821	Succeeded by James Saumarez, 1st Baron de Saumarez
