= James Young (Royal Navy officer, born 1762) =

Officer of the British Royal Navy (1762–1833)

- Born: 1762
- Died: 8 March 1833 (aged 70–71); Barton End House, Gloucestershire
- Relatives: James Young (father); William Young (half-brother)
- Military career
- Allegiance: United Kingdom of Great Britain and Ireland
- Branch: Royal Navy
- Service years: – 1833
- Rank: Vice-Admiral of the White
- Commands: HMS Comet; HMS Zealous; HMS Greyhound; HMS Unicorn; HMS Ethalion; HMS Pique; HMS Valiant
- Conflicts: French Revolutionary Wars; Napoleonic Wars; Second Battle of Copenhagen

James Young (1762 – 8 March 1833) was an officer of the Royal Navy who saw service during the French Revolutionary and Napoleonic Wars, rising to the rank of vice-admiral of the white.

Young was born in 1762, the son of a naval officer. He followed his father, and an older half-brother, into the navy and was promoted to commander early in the French Revolutionary Wars while serving in the West Indies with Sir John Jervis. His first command was a fireship, though he was also temporary commander of a 74-gun warship, before being promoted to post captain and given a frigate. He was successful in cruising against privateers, and was given another ship, in which in late 1799, he was involved in the chase of two Spanish frigates, capturing one of them. They were found to be transporting valuable cargoes from the Spanish colonies, and their capture made the captains involved extremely wealthy men, with their crews also receiving huge sums of money comparative to their usual wages.

Young commanded a frigate in the Mediterranean for the rest of the French Revolutionary Wars, paying her off at the peace. He did not immediately return to service with the outbreak of the Napoleonic Wars, and it was not until 1807 that he commissioned a 74-gun ship and joined the expedition to Copenhagen. Promoted to flag rank towards the end of the Napoleonic Wars, Young was further advanced to vice-admiral in 1830, and died three years later with the rank of vice-admiral of the white.

== Family and first commands ==
James Young was born into a naval family in 1762, the son of the naval officer James Young, who would become an admiral, and his second wife Sophia. William, his half-brother by his father's first marriage to Elizabeth Bolton, also embarked on a naval career and rose to be Vice-Admiral of the United Kingdom, with the rank of admiral of the red. James Young followed his father and brother into the navy, and after several years of service, was promoted to commander in 1794, shortly after the start of the French Revolutionary Wars, by Sir John Jervis. He had been serving with Jervis in the West Indies prior to this, and on returning to Britain aboard Reprisal, was given command of the fireship HMS Comet. Young briefly served as acting-commander of the 74-gun HMS Zealous from June 1795, after her previous captain, Christopher Mason, had been promoted to rear-admiral. Young went out to the Mediterranean, before returning to resume command of Comet. He was promoted to post captain on 5 October 1795.

Young was given command of the 32-gun HMS Greyhound in 1796 and cruised in the North Sea, and then in the English Channel, where he was particularly successfully against privateers, capturing the 16-gun Aventure off Cape Barfleur at 4.am on 19 December 1796 and Tartane off Beachy Head at 7.am on 18 February 1797. Aventure was a privateer brig carrying sixteen 4-pounder guns and a crew of 62 men, under the command of Citizen Peltier. She was two days out of Calais on her first cruise and had not captured any prizes. Tartane was also a brig, mounting sixteen 4-pounder guns and carrying 60 men, on a cruise from Dieppe. She had not taken any prizes, and in his report on the capture, Young paid tribute to Captain Cheshire of the 18-gun sloop HMS Plover, who having seen the chase, manoeuvred to cut off Tartane's escape. Young commanded Greyhound until March 1797, when he took command of the 32-gun HMS Unicorn.

== Ethalion and Thetis ==
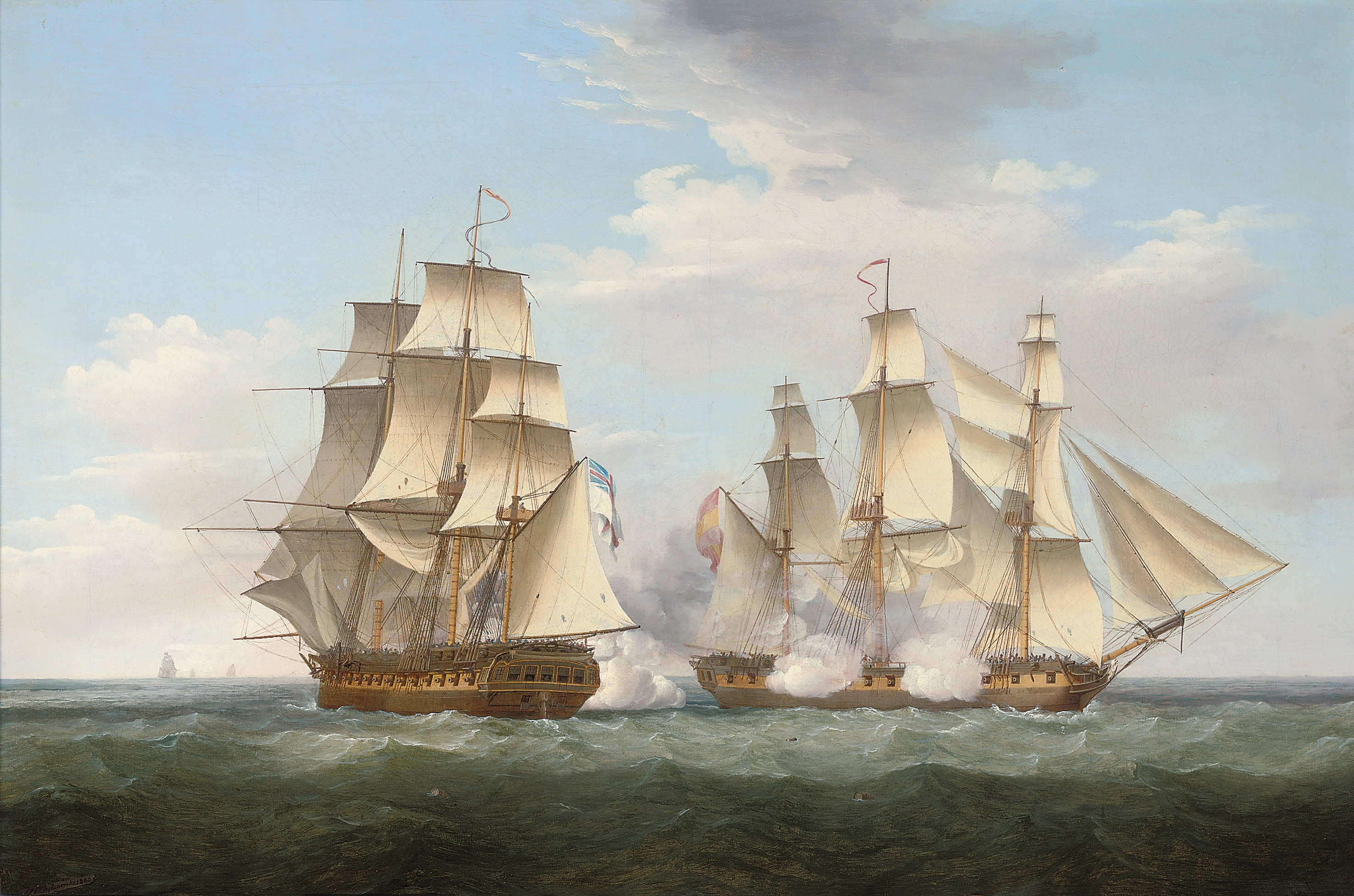
HMS Ethalion in action with the Spanish frigate Thetis off Cape Finisterre, 16 October 1799, Thomas Whitcombe, 1800

Young's next ship was the 38-gun HMS Ethalion, which he took over in February 1799. At 3pm on 16 October 1799 Ethalion sighted three sails, and bearing up, discovered that they were two enemy frigates, being pursued by the 38-gun HMS Naiad, under Captain William Pierrepoint. Young joined the chase, and the following morning the British were joined by another frigate, HMS Alcmene, under Captain Henry Digby, while a fourth frigate, HMS Triton, under Captain John Gore, was also sighted, joining from astern. Pierrepoint signalled his intention to engage the foremost ship, leaving the sternmost for Young in Ethalion, and at 7am the ships, now discerned to be Spanish frigates, separated. Ethalion pursued the sternmost frigate, exchanging fire from their stern and bow chasers, and after closing and firing two broadsides, the Spanish ship surrendered. She was discovered to be the 36-gun Thetis, carrying 12- and 6-pdr guns and with a crew of 250, under the command of Don Juan de Mendoza. She was bound from Veracruz to a Spanish port, carrying a cargo of 1,411,526 dollars and cocoa. Ethalion suffered no casualties during the chase, while there was one man killed and nine wounded aboard Thetis. Meanwhile, Naiad, in company with Alcmene and Triton, chased down and captured the other Spanish frigate, which was discovered to be the Santa Brigada, also carrying a valuable cargo. Each captain received £40,730.18s. in prize money,^{[a]} approximately £4.02 million at today's prices.

The sum paid out was so large that it was said that the crew of the ships involved roamed around Portsmouth with 'bank notes stuck in their hats, buying watches for the fun of frying them, and issuing laws that any of their crew who appeared without a gold-laced hat should be cobbed, so that the unlucky man who appeared in silver could only escape by representing that the costlier articles were all bought up, but he had compelled the shopkeeper to take money for gold lace.' Each seaman involved received £182 4s 9¾d, the equivalent of ten years pay.

== Pique and Valiant ==
Young took command of the 36-gun HMS Pique in June 1800 and commanded her in the Mediterranean for the remainder of the French Revolutionary Wars. On 5 June 1801 he came across a large French squadron under Honoré Joseph Antoine Ganteaume, sailing to land troops in Egypt. The fleet pursued Pique for a time, but could not catch her. Young escaped, and then made his way to report the French movements to Admiral Lord Keith. Young sailed back to Britain to pay Pique off after the end of the wars, and arrived in port on 2 July 1802. He does not appear to have returned to service after the outbreak of the Napoleonic Wars until April 1807, when he commissioned the new 74-gun HMS Valiant. Young went out with Rear-Admiral William Essington's force to Copenhagen in mid-1807, arriving off the city on 7 July.

== Flag rank and later life ==
Young was promoted to rear-admiral in 1814, and to vice-admiral in 1830. He died at Barton End House, Gloucestershire with the rank of Vice-Admiral of the White on 8 March 1833 at the age of 67. He had married Charlotte Ann, the daughter of Colonel (later Lieutenant-General) Fyers of the Royal Engineers while at Gibraltar in 1802. She was renowned as the 'beauty of the rock', and together the two had a large family, including eight daughters.

Of their daughters, Sabine Anne Young married Captain John Jervis Tucker RN; and Sophia Young married Bartholomew James Sulivan.

== Notes ==
a. Lieutenants received £5,091.7s.3d., warrant officers £2,468.10s.9d., petty officers £791.17s., and seamen and marines £182.42s.9d.
