= The First Salute =

18th-century recognition of US independence

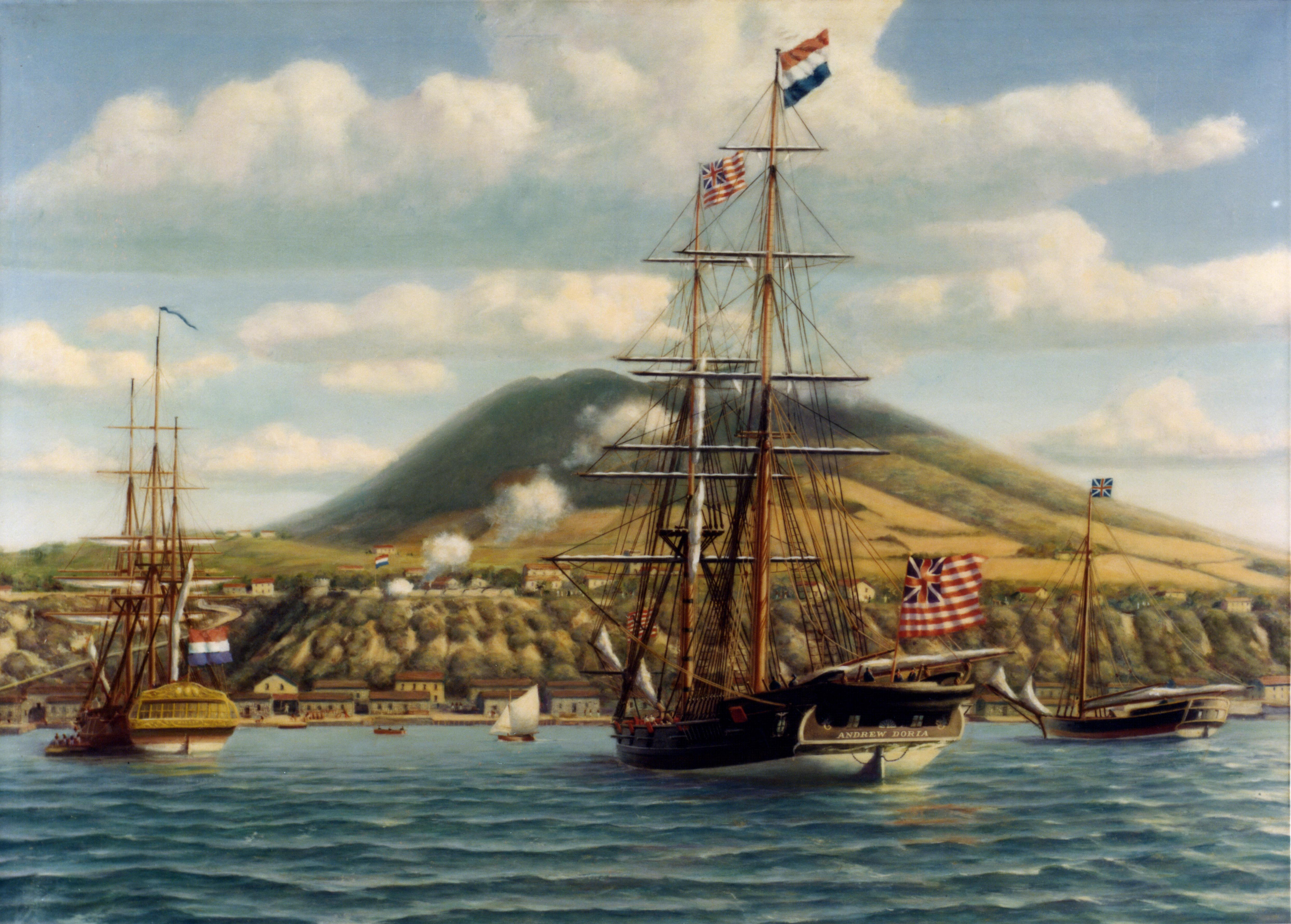
- The Andrew Doria receives the First Salute
- Date: November 16, 1776
- Location: Fort Oranje, Sint Eustatius; 17°28′55″N 62°59′12″W
- Type: gun salute
- Theme: Recognition of American independence
- Cause: United States Declaration of Independence

The First Salute is the cannon salute fired on 16 November 1776 at Sint Eustatius from Fort Orange by the Dutch in response to the salute of the American ship Andrew Doria. A few months after the United States Declaration of Independence, this marked the first recognition of the United States by a foreign power. The event was followed by the Fourth Anglo-Dutch War and capture of Sint Eustatius.

== Trading hub ==
By the mid-18th century, there were more than 70 slave plantations on the Dutch colony of Sint Eustatius. A number of wealthy families dominated the administration. Although they often quarreled among themselves, they formed a united front when their shared interests were threatened. At this time, global trade was hindered by mercantilism, the economic theory that considered imports harmful and exports advantageous.

In 1688, the Dutch West India Company allowed international trade on the Caribbean island at low import and export tariffs. Until 1730, the slave trade was relatively significant, after which it declined. On the other hand, trade in coffee, tobacco, and especially sugar increased. These goods came from the island itself as well as from nearby British and French colonies. In 1756, these free trade rules were formalized. Trade on the island developed rapidly with European goods such as textiles, paper, glass, dairy products, and wine. Around 1780, Benjamin Franklin, one of the Founding Fathers of the United States, decided to route mail to Europe via Sint Eustatius. The most lucrative trade of all was in weapons needed for wars between European nations. For two decades, the island experienced unprecedented prosperity.

== American Revolution ==
Presentation of the United States Declaration of Independence to the Congress on 28 June 1776 by the Committee of Five. Painting by John Trumbull, 1819.

As a result of the American Revolutionary War, there was a significant demand for weapons and military supplies by the Patriots, who began a large-scale illicit arms trade via Sint Eustatius, exchanging guns and gunpowder for colonial goods such as sugar and cotton. This trade soon became so lucrative for all parties involved that profits on gunpowder reached up to 100% and warehouses in the colony were often so full that excess colonial goods acquired from American merchants were often stored outdoors. American merchants soon bought nearly half of all weapons and ammunition in Sint Eustatius.

This illicit trade, and the refusal of Dutch authorities to take action against it, deeply angered Great Britain, as it violated prior Anglo-Dutch treaties. The Dutch Republic initially argued that as the Revolutionary War was a colonial rebellion, which was not explicitly mentioned in the treaties, they did not need to take action. However, under British diplomatic pressure the Dutch eventually reversed this position and prohibited all Dutch subjects from exporting arms and other military supplies to the rebelling Americans. Jan de Windt, the governor of Sint Eustatius, did not comply with the ban, nor did his successor Johannes de Graaff. De Graaff was the wealthiest man on the island, owning 10 plantations, 300 slaves and 16 merchant ships.

== The First Salute ==
In July 1776, thirteen North American colonies had signed the United States Declaration of Independence. On 16 November 1776, the Andrew Doria visited the harbor of Sint Eustatius to load weapons and ammunition. It was the first American ship flying the new American flag (the Continental Union Flag) to enter the harbor. Governor Johannes de Graaff ordered that the ship be received with full honors. After the Andrew Doria fired a salute in greeting, he commanded that it be returned with salutes from Fort Orange. Once docked, he hosted a celebration for the captain and invited all Americans on the island. The Americans accepted the salute as the first recognition of the United States by a foreign power.

== British reaction ==
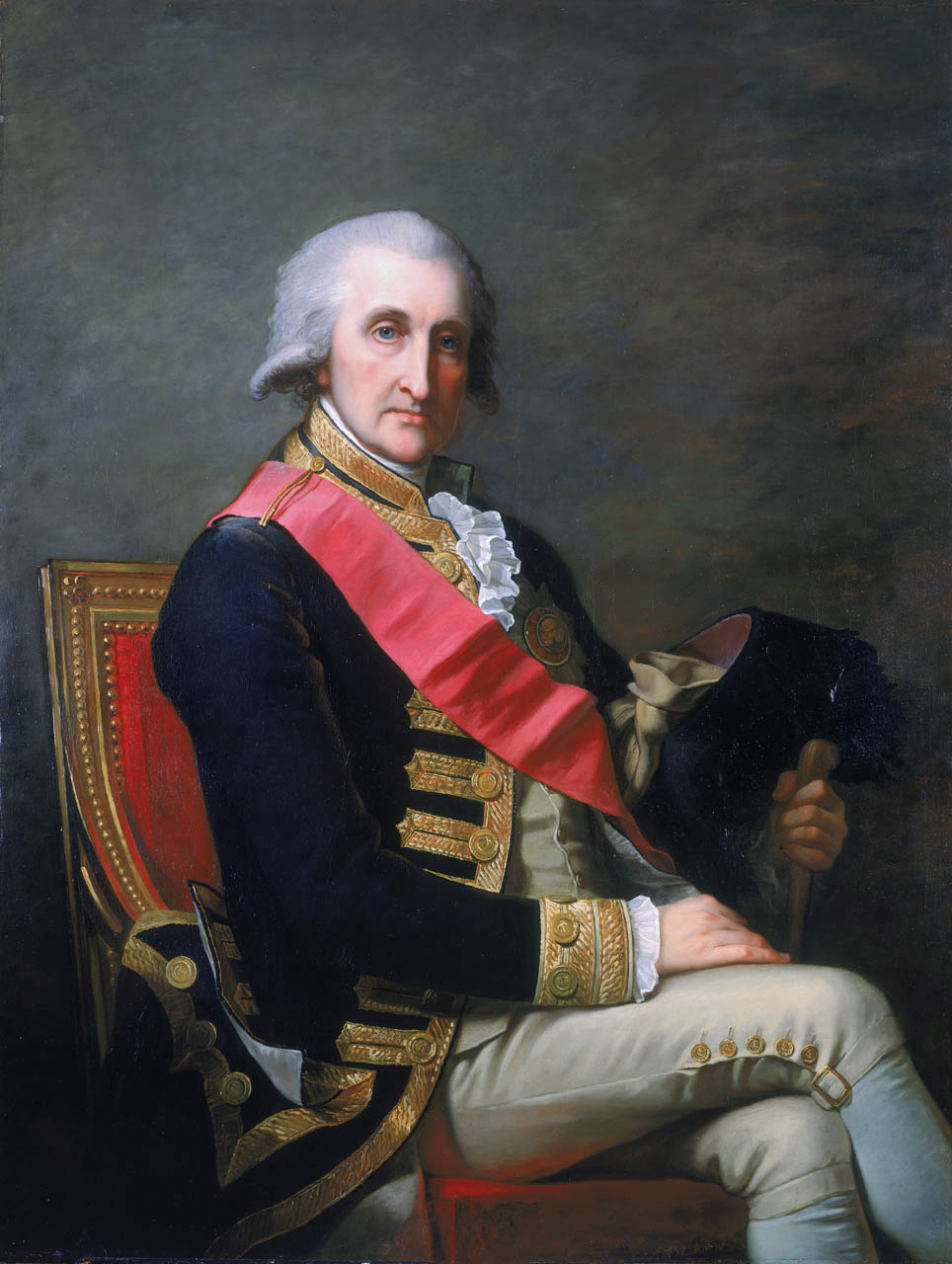
George Rodney, 1791 Painting by Jean-Laurent Mosnier

During the firing of the salute shots, English ships were present in the harbor. They weighed anchor and sailed to the neighboring island of Saint Kitts to report the incident. The British government was further angered by the salute and demanded the States General of the Netherlands publicly condemn it and dismiss De Graaff. In response, the States General summoned him to the Hague for questioning, but De Graaff delayed his voyage with various excuses, from family matters to seasickness. In 1778, he arrived with a lengthy defense containing numerous distortions of the truth and outright lies. The States General accepted his defense, in part because Amsterdam merchants also profited greatly from the illicit arms trade on Sint Eustatius.

Anglo-Dutch relations continued to deteriorate as the British government cited the Dutch failure to dismiss De Graaff as an example of their continued unreliability as an ally. In addition to refusing to provide support for Britain during the ongoing conflict, the Dutch sought to join the First League of Armed Neutrality in the final months of 1780; the league, founded by Catherine the Great, was intended to prevent neutral merchant shipping from being inspected by the Royal Navy for contraband. The British navy also captured a ship on which the American diplomat Henry Laurens was travelling to the Hague, discovering a trading contract between US and Dutch mercantile interests. On 20 December 1780, Britain declared war on the Dutch Republic, initiating the Fourth Anglo-Dutch War.

British Admiral George Rodney was subsequently ordered to capture Sint Eustatius. He held a personal grudge against the island because supplies for repairs had been sent to a French fleet after he had heavily damaged it. Rodney arrived on 3 February 1781 with 17 warships, and De Graaff surrendered the colony without resistance. Rodney arrested several of the island's residents and had them deported to neighboring colonies or Europe, along with confiscating numerous goods and valuable items he found. Due to gout and prostate enlargement, he returned to England. On the voyage home, nearly all of his possessions were captured by the French navy, preventing him from paying debts at home. British merchants from Sint Eustatius challenged his confiscations in court. In the House of Commons, opposition leader Edmund Burke delivered a speech condemning Rodney's actions in Sint Eustatius.

== Restoration of the old island order ==
Sint Eustatius did not remain under British control for long. In November 1781, a surprise attack under French command captured the island. The old order was restored, and residents were returned their property as far as possible. In 1784, France returned sovereignty over the island to the Netherlands. A decade of great economic prosperity followed. De Graaff also returned to the island, but now as a civilian. Upon his death in 1813, he left behind immense wealth.

== Commemoration ==
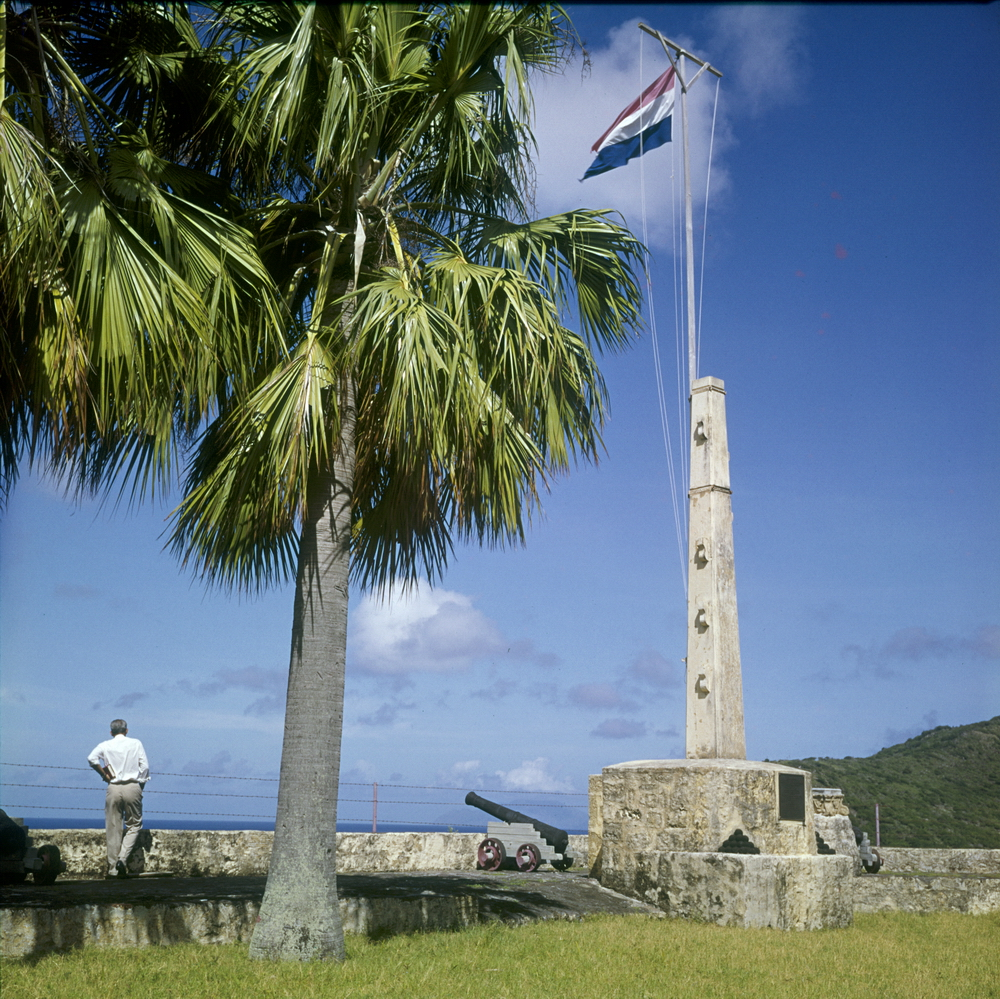
Plaque by president Franklin D. Roosevelt at the flagpole in Fort Orange, 1939

De Graaff is commemorated as a hero of the American Revolution with a portrait in the State House of the American state of New Hampshire.

In 1939, President Franklin D. Roosevelt presented a plaque to Sint Eustatius, in recognition of the First Salute. It is mounted on the square at Fort Orange at the flagpole. Roosevelt was not on the island, as the citizens had hoped that year. The Roosevelt family was not unfamiliar with the island. In 1759, Adolphus Roosevelt and Elizabeth Groebe had married there.

In 1976, the plaque commemorating the 200th anniversary of the United States was unveiled, a gift from the United States Virgin Islands, and in 2001 and 2014, plaques of The First Salute from the Sons and the Daughters of the American Revolution were unveiled.

Barbara W. Tuchman's book The First Salute was published in 1988.

In November 2026, King Willem-Alexander of the Netherlands visited the island to commemorate the 250th anniversary of The First Salute.

== See also ==
- Statia Day, a national day recognizing the event in Sint Eustatius.
