= Governors of Sint Eustatius, Saba and Sint Maarten =

The governor of Sint Eustatius, Saba and Sint Maarten represented the Dutch rule in the Netherlands Antilles between 1639 and 1854.

== List of governors ==
- Pieter Gardijn (1639?–1641)
- Abraham Adriaensz. (1641–1644)
- Pieter van de Woestijne (1644–?)
- Abraham Adriaensz. (1647?)
- Pieter Adriaensz. (1665)
- Thomas Morgan (Eng.) (1665–1666)
- Rose (Fr.) (1666-?)
- Pieter Adriaensz? (1668–1671)
- Lucas Jacobsen (1671–1672)
- John Pogson (Eng.) (1672–?)
- Peter Batterie (Eng.) (1674?–?)
- Louis Houtcooper (1682–1686)
- Lucas Schorer (1686–1689)
- Comte de Blennac? (Fr.) (1689–1690)
- Thimotheus Thornhill (Eng.) (1690–1693)
- Johannis Salomonsz. (1693–1700)
- Jan Symonson Donker (a.i.) (1700–1701)
- Isaac Lamont (1701–1704)
- Jan Symonson Donker (a.i.) (1704–1709)
- Isaac Lamont (1709–1712)
- Jan Symonson Donker (1712–1717)
- Gerard de Mepsche (1717)
- Jan Heyliger (a.i.) (1717–1719)
- J. Stalperts (1719–1720)
- Jan Heyliger (a.i.) (1720–1721)
- Jacobus Stevensen (1721–1722)
- J. Linderay (a.i.) (1722–1725)
- J. Linderay (1725–1728)
- Everardt Raecx (1728–1733)
- Jan Heyliger (a.i.) (1733–1734)
- Jan Heyliger (1734–1736)
- Pieter Markoe (a.i.) (1736–1737)
- Isaak Faesch (1737–1740)
- Hendrik Coesvelt (1740–1741)
- Jasper Ellis (a.i.) (1741–1743)
- Johannes Heyliger Pz. (1743–1752)
- Jan de Windt (a.i.) (1752–1754)
- Jan de Windt (1754–1775)
- Abraham Heyliger (a.i.) (1775–1776)
- Johannes de Graeff (1776–1781)
- David Ogilvy (Eng.) (1781)
- James Cockburn (Eng.) (1781)
- Charles Chabert (Fr.) (1781–1784)
- Olivier Oyen (a.i.) (1784–1785)
- Abraham Heyliger (1785)
- Johannes Runnels (a.i.) (1785–1789)
- Pieter Anthony Godin (1789–1792)
- Johannes Runnels (a.i.) (1792–1795)
- Daniel Roda (a.i.) (1795–1801)
- Richard Blunt (Eng.) (1801–1802)
- John Wardlau (Eng.) (1802)
- Daniel Roda (a.i.) (1802)
- Albert van Heyningen (1802–1809)
- William Charles Mussenden (a.i.) (1809–1810)
- Charles(?) Barrow (Eng.) (1810–1816)
- Reinier 't Hoen (a.i.) (1816–1817)
- Abraham de Veer (1817–1822)
- Diederik Johannes van Romondt (a.i.) (1822–1823)
- Willem Augustus van Spengler (1825–1828)
- Thomas Peter Richardson (1828, ad-interim)
- Willem Johan Leendert van Raders (1828–1834)
- Willem Johan Leendert van Raders (1834–1836)
- Theophilus George Groebe (a.i.) (1836–1837)
- Johannes de Veer (1837–1854)
