= Golden Rock (anthem) =

Regional anthem of Sint Eustatius

St. Eustatius
- Regional anthem of Sint Eustatius
- Lyrics: Pieter A. van den Heuvel
- Music: Jan Morks (1919)
- Adopted: 2004/2010

Audio sample
- Digital instrumental and vocal rendition: file; help

"Golden Rock" (Dutch: Gouden Rots) is the regional anthem of Sint Eustatius, which was established by the Island Council on July 29, 2004, and was officially ratified on October 8, 2010. The anthem was composed by Pieter A. van den Heuvel.

The lyrics were written to the melody of the Zeeland national anthem (Zeeuws volkslied), the music of which was written by Jan Morks in 1919.

== Lyrics ==
English original

I
Between the deep blue ocean,
And the Caribbean Sea,
Where the waves are in motion
Lies a Pearl so dear to me,
From Quill to Little Mountain
From Venus to White Wall,
Long ago a Golden Fountain
Once a diamond waterfall.

Chorus:
Golden Rock, I'll always miss you,
When I am far from thee,
Never, never I'll forget you
Where-so-ever I may be.

II
Statia's past, you are admired,
though Rodney filled his bag,
The First salute was fired to'
The American Flag,
The freedom of a nation,
Promoted by our Fort,
America and Statia,
Both praise for it our Lord.

Chorus

III
Among the ruined houses,
Of low and upper town,
There a lofty feeling rouses,
Which never can break down,
Its faithfulness forever,
As ever it has been,
May God forsake us never,
And save Governor and Queen.

Chorus

Dutch translation

I
Tussen de diepe, blauwe oceaan
En de Caraïbische Zee
Waar de golven in beweging zijn,
Ligt een Parel, mij zo dierbaar,
Van de Quill tot de Little Mountain,
Van Venus tot White Wall,
Een Gouden Bron lang geleden
Ooit een diamanten waterval.

Refrein:
Gouden Rots, ik zal u altijd missen,
Wanneer ik ver van u ben.
Nooit, nooit zal ik u vergeten,
Waar ik ook moge zijn.

II
Statia's verleden, gij wordt bewonderd,
Al vult Rodney zijn zak,
Al wordt het Eerste Saluut gevuurd voor
De Amerikaanse Vlag -
De vrijheid van een natie,
Bevorderd door ons Fort -
Amerikaan en Statiaan,
Beiden prijs ik voor onze Heer.

Refrein

III
Tussen de verwoeste huizen
Van de lage en hoge stad,
Daar staat een verheven gevoel op
Dat nooit kan instorten,
Zijn getrouwheid voor eeuwig,
Zoals het nooit geweest is,
Moge God ons nooit verlaten
En Gouverneur en Koningin bewaren.

Refrein

== See also ==
- List of national anthems
