= Barton End =

Coordinates: 51.679°N 2.222°W

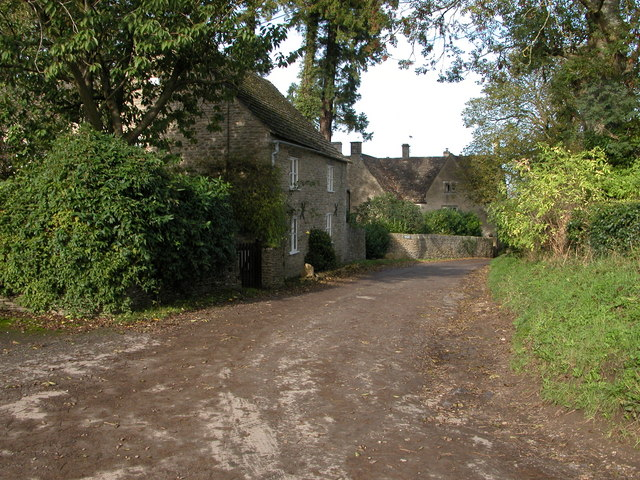
- Upper Barton End

- Location within Gloucestershire
- OS grid reference: ST847978
- Civil parish: Horsley
- District: Stroud
- Shire county: Gloucestershire
- Region: South West
- Country: England
- Sovereign state: United Kingdom
- Post town: STROUD
- Postcode district: GL6
- Dialling code: 01453
- Police: Gloucestershire
- Fire: Gloucestershire
- Ambulance: South Western
- UK Parliament: Stroud

Barton End is a hamlet just south of Nailsworth, Gloucestershire, England.
