= Broad pennant =

Naval flag

A broad pennant is a triangular swallow-tailed naval pennant flown from the masthead of a warship afloat or a naval headquarters ashore to indicate the presence of either:

(a) a Royal Navy officer in the rank of Commodore, or

(b) a U.S. Navy Captain serving in a designated Commodore command billet.

The flag is so called as a broad pennant because its dimensions are roughly 2:3.

== United Kingdom ==
Royal Navy Pennant

Starting in 1826, a Royal Navy commodore would fly one of two broad pennants depending on whether he had a captain for his ship (First Class Commodore), or also had to command it himself (Second Class). This difference was shown by a ball added to the pennant of the Second Class rank holder, as shown above. In 1958, the rank of First Class Commodore was terminated, after which only the red and white broad pennant with a ball was used by the Royal Navy.

== United States ==
United States Navy command pennants

The U.S. Navy will also refer to this flag as a Commodore's "command pennant." In the U.S. Navy, the blue and white pennant will contain either numbers or letters indicating the command designation or name. For example, the pennant for the Commodore commanding Destroyer Squadron 25 (DESRON 25) will have the numeral "25" on the field of their command pennant. Likewise, the Commodore commanding Strike Fighter Wing Atlantic will have the letters "SFWL" or "CSFWL" on their pennant. In U.S. Naval Aviation, this pennant is also used by the commander of a carrier air wing.

The broad command pennant is used in all respects the same as an admiral's flag. When embarked aboard a warship as the senior officer, it is broken aboard that commodore's flagship at the same points of hoist as an admiral's flag. It is also carried at the bow of a boat in which they are embarked, emblazoned on their social letterhead, displayed on a staff in his or her office ashore, and, if they should die in command, half-masted aboard their flagship and carried before their casket in the funeral ceremony.

Also in the U.S. Navy, a red and white Burgee command pennant, similar to but smaller in the size than the Commodore's command pennant, has been flown by subordinate commanding officers, typically officers in the rank of Commander, of smaller aircraft units such as aviation squadrons or similar precedence units such as SEAL Teams or Naval Mobile Construction Battalions. For commanding officers of commissioned warships in the U.S. Navy, the ship's commissioning pennant is considered to carry the symbolism of that vessel's commanding officer versus the red and white command pennant for aviation squadrons or other non-warship operational commands.
