= HMS Portland (1770) =

Ship of the line of the Royal Navy

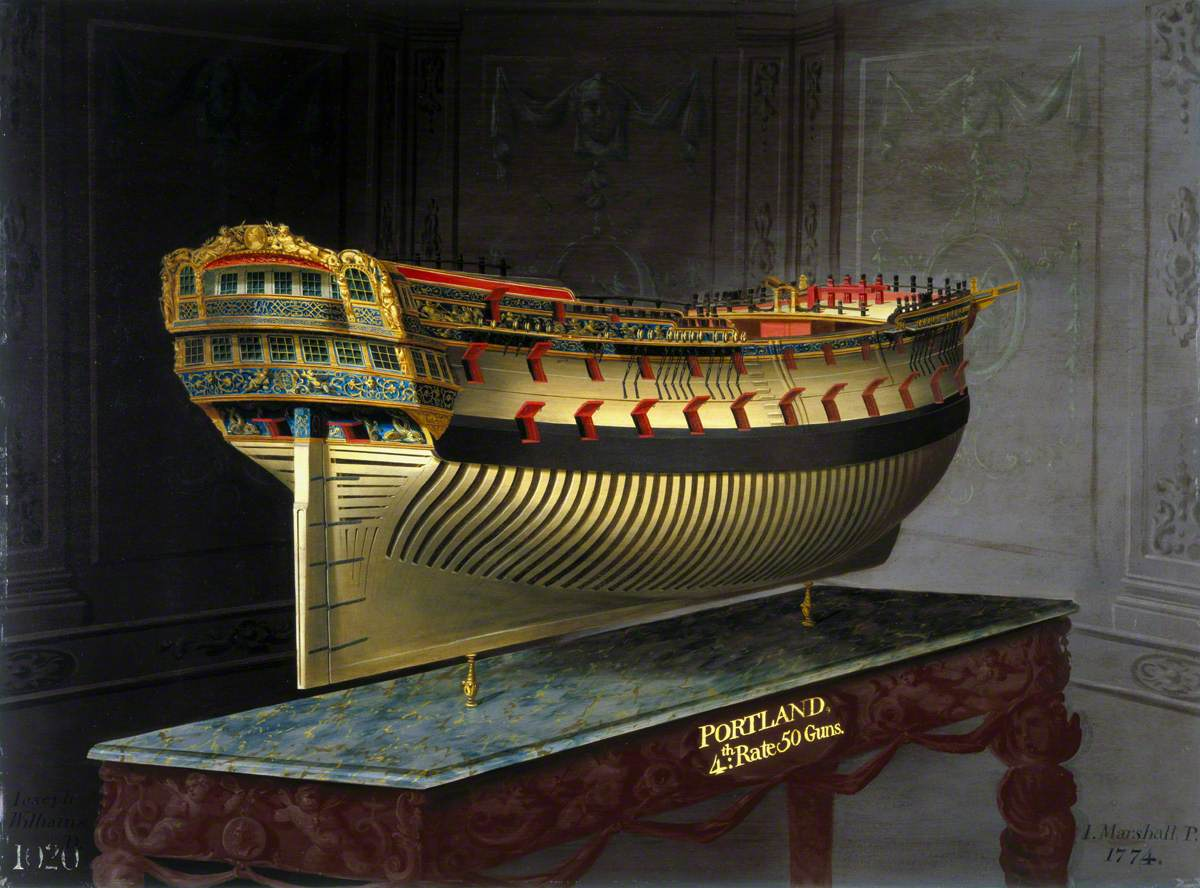
- HMS Portland (1770)

History

Great Britain
- Name: Portland
- Builder: Sheerness Dockyard
- Commissioned: 25 September 1770
- Reinstated: November 1797 refitted as a unrated prison ship
- Honours and awards: Affair of Fielding and Bylandt
- Fate: Sold 19 May 1817 to Daniel List for £800

General characteristics
- Tons burthen: 1,044 77/94
- Length: 146 ft (44.5 m) (gundeck)
- Depth of hold: 17 ft 6 in (5.3 m)
- Propulsion: Sails
- Sail plan: Full-rigged ship
- Armament: 50 guns: Gundeck: 22 × 24 pdrs; Upper gundeck: 22 × 12 pdrs; Quarterdeck: 4 × 6 pdrs; Forecastle: 2 × 6 pdrs

HMS Portland was a 50-gun fourth-rate ship of the line of the Royal Navy. Designed by Sir John Williams, it was first launched on 11 April 1770.

== Service ==
In 1773, the ship called at Sheerness in Kent. The ship joined a convoy of merchant ships and headed for the Americas via Madeira. The ship patrolled waters around the Leeward Islands, the Windward Islands and Jamaica. During this time, the ship spent nearly a month at Port Royal, Jamaica. Cuthbert Collingwood served as midshipman on the ship during 1773.

The ship served during the American Revolutionary War: On 13 February, 1778 she captured sloop "Swallow" 108 Leagues south west of Anguilla. On 16 May, 1778 her sloop/tender HMS Tartar captured the Massachusetts brigantine privateer "Eagle".

== Issue with privateers ==
During the American Revolution, the Portland captured the privateer ship known as the Hammond. This would result in the ship's captain, Thomas Dumaresq and flag officer Admiral James Young getting arrested by the Court of Vice-Admiralty at Antigua due to the tribunal of declaring the privateers as legal even without the proper paperwork. This resulted in a high-profile case surrounding Captain Thomas Dumaresq of the Portland that had the First Lord of the Admiralty, John Montagu, 4th Earl of Sandwich and King George III involved. Eventually after a deal between the British government and Antigua, charges were dropped.

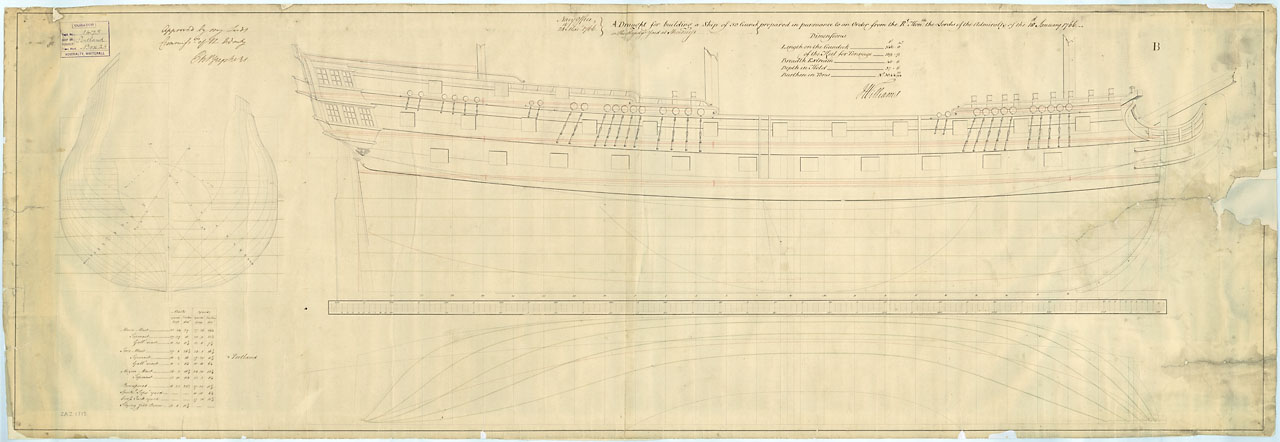
Lines of Portland

== Bibliography ==
- Adams, Max (2005). Admiral Collingwood: Nelson's Own Hero. London: Orion Books. ISBN 978-0297846406.
