= Fort Oranje (Sint Eustatius) =

Historic fortress in Sint Eustatius

- Oranjestad, Sint Eustatius
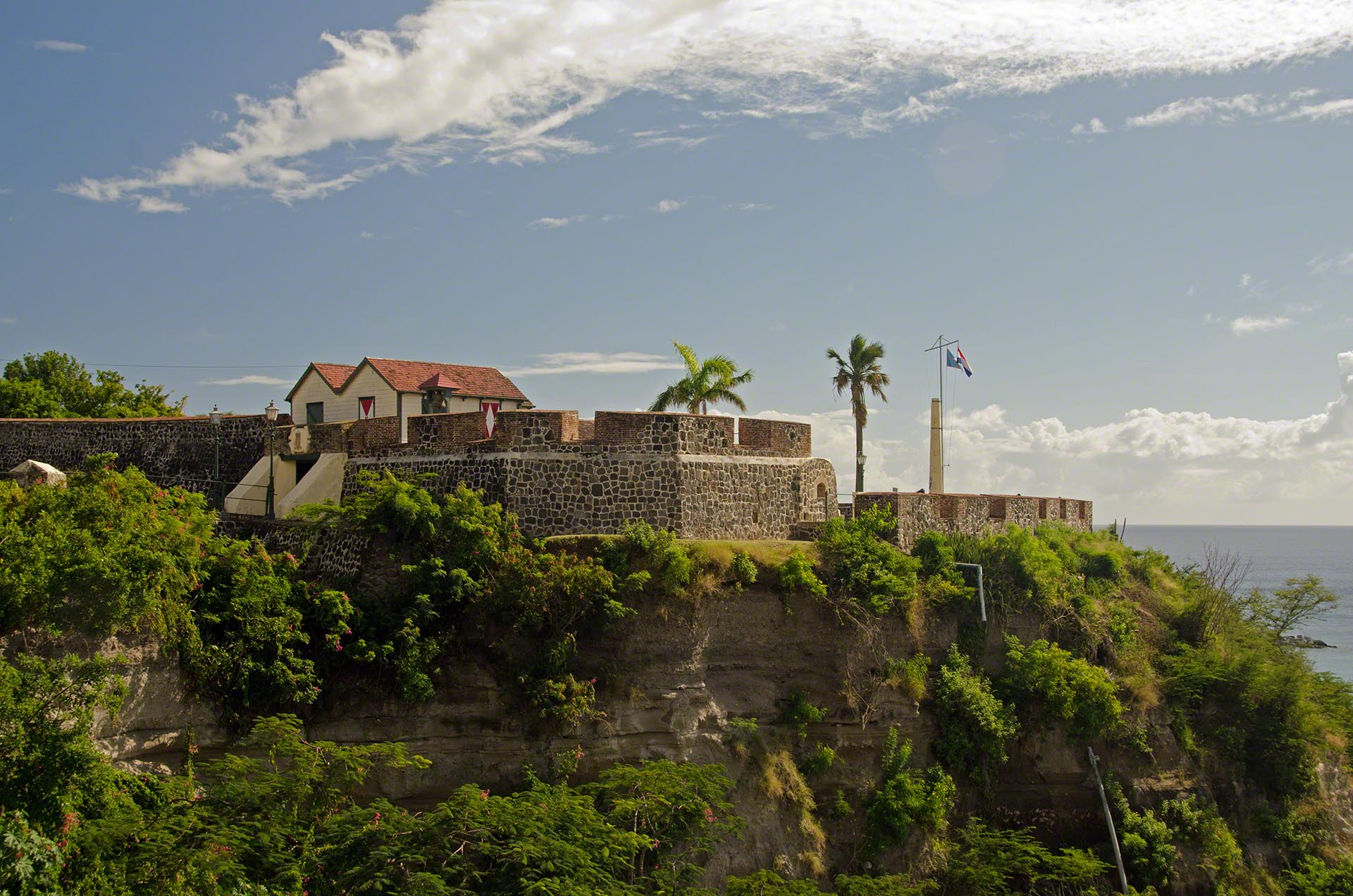
- View of Fort Oranje

Site information
- Type: Fortification
- Open to the public: Yes

Location
- Location within Sint Eustatius shown using the map of the islands of the former Netherlands Antilles
- Location within Netherlands Antilles
- Coordinates: 17°28′55″N 62°59′12″W

Site history
- Built: 1636
- In use: No

Fort Oranje is a historic fortress located in Sint Eustatius in the Dutch Caribbean. It is located in Oranjestad, the island's capital, on a cliff overlooking Oranje Bay. It was named after the House of Oranje, the royal family of the Netherlands.

The fort was built by the Dutch in 1636, at the location of a previous fort built by the French in 1629. Its construction was commissioned by the Dutch West India Company. Like the island, the fort changed‌ ‌hands‌ several times ‌between‌ ‌the‌ ‌Dutch,‌ ‌English‌ ‌and‌ ‌French‌. It was rebuilt and renovated several times during the 17th and 18th centuries. Today, the fort is one of many protected buildings in Sint Eustatius.

== History ==
The first European settlers on St. Eustatius were the French, who arrived from 1625 and 1629. They came from nearby St. Kitts. In 1629, the French built a wooden fortress at the present-day location of Fort Oranje. The French abandoned the fort and the island due to lack of clean drinking water.

In 1636, Dutch settlers from Zeeland took possession of the then unoccupied St. Eustatius. With a commission from the Dutch West India Company, they constructed a new fort at the location where they found remains of the French fort. They named the new fortress Fort Oranje after the House of Oranje, the Dutch royal family.

The original Fort Oranje for square-shaped, with four bastions, a courtyard, and 16 mounted cannons. Historians presume it was wooden, as it was burned by the Dutch in 1673 and rebuilt by the English later in the year. In 1689, the French took over the island and fort, and carried out additional renovations of the fort. They reinforced the walls with doubled palisades and built a dry moat around the fort. Beginning in 1737, the fort underwent a series of renovations by the Dutch via the work of enslaved Africans.

Until 1846, Fort Oranje served as a garrison for army infantry and artillery. After being empty for many years, the fortress was refurbished and furnished as an administrative center to house the lieutenant governor's office, government services, and the prison.

After partial fire destruction in 1990, the fort was restored in the late 1990s. Since then, the offices of the public prosecutor's office, the planning department, and the tourist office have been kept here.

== The "First Salute" ==
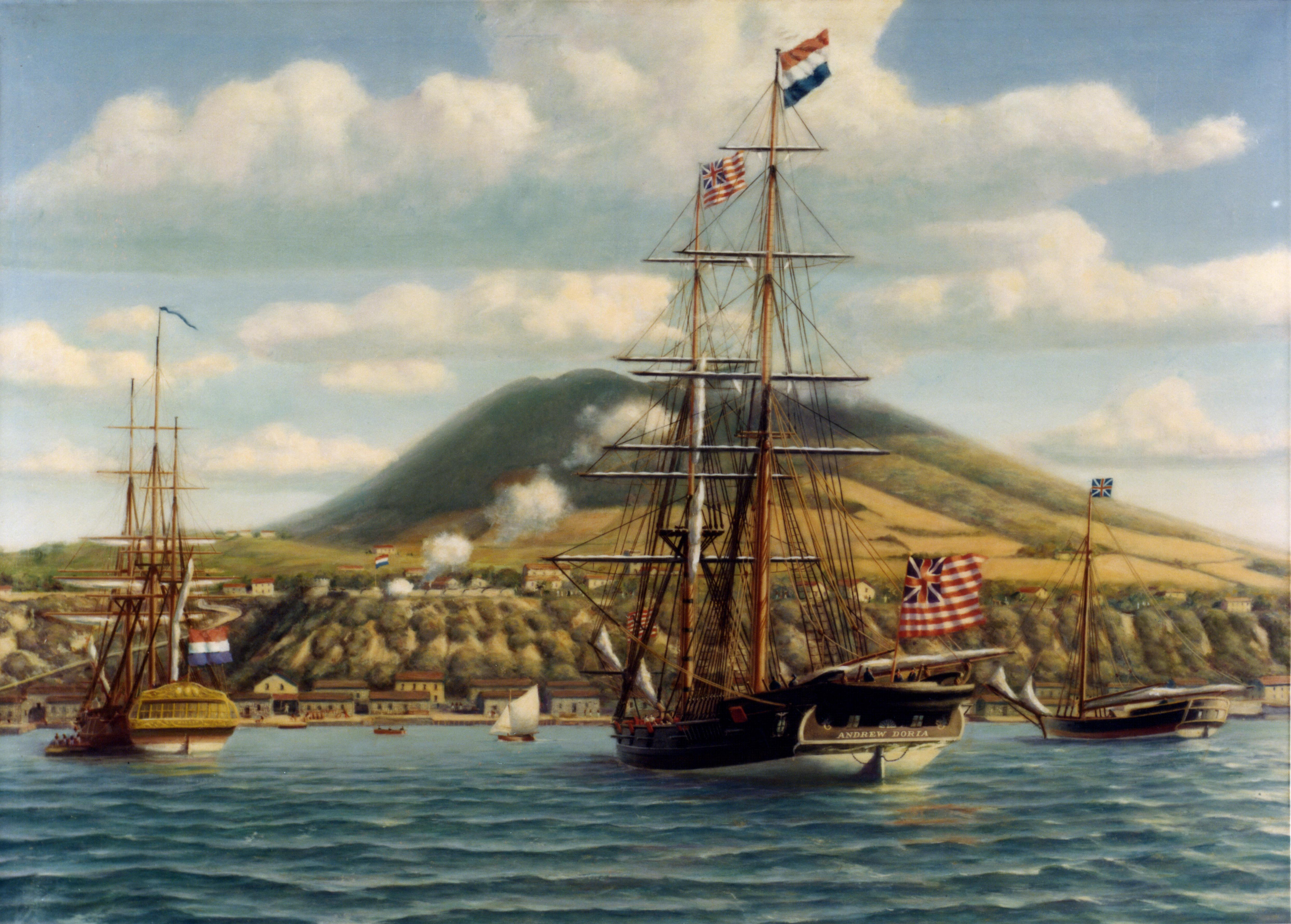
Painting (by Phillips Melville) depicting Andrew Doria receiving The First Salute from the Fort Oranje.

It was from Fort Oranje that the First Salute was fired on 16 November 1776. Dutch governor Johannes de Graaff had the fort's cannons return a salute of 11 shots to the USS Andrew Doria, which had entered the island's harbor. The ship was flying the new Continental Union Flag, as the American thirteen colonies had just declared their independence from the British. Many interpreted the salute as the first recognition by a foreign power of America's independence. It was one of the reasons for the Fourth Anglo-Dutch War (1780-1784).

In 1939, President Franklin Delano Roosevelt offered a plaque in recognition of the First Salute. The plaque was placed against the flagpole in the fort square.

== Preservation ==
Between February 2019 to May 2020, the cliff supporting Fort Oranje underwent a stabilization project to help increase the cliff's stability and stop erosion. The project involved the placement of 2,800 anchors, 7,400 square meters of canvas, and more than 15,000 square meters of mesh.

== Gallery ==
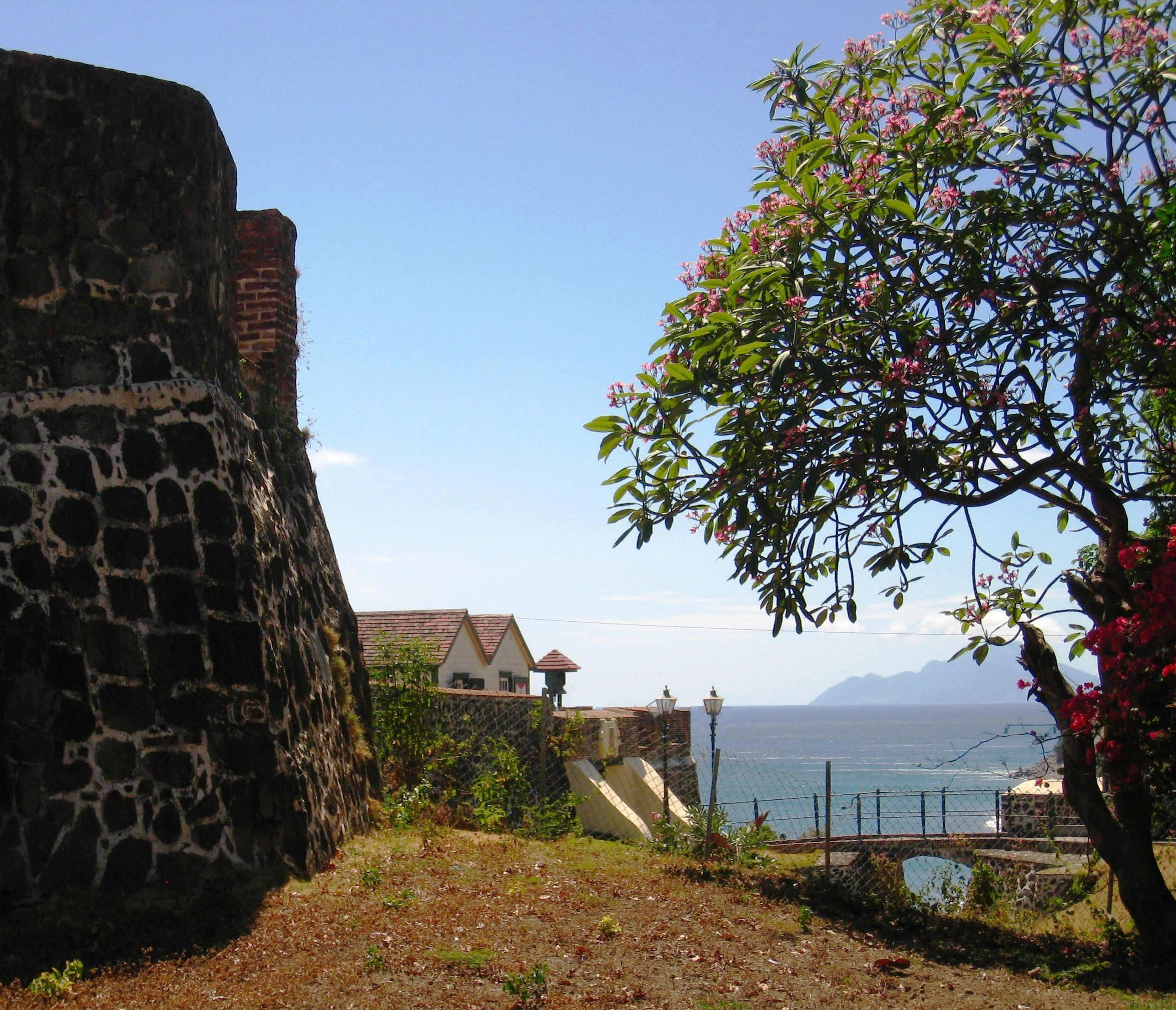
The walls of Fort Oranje with the island of Saba in the background

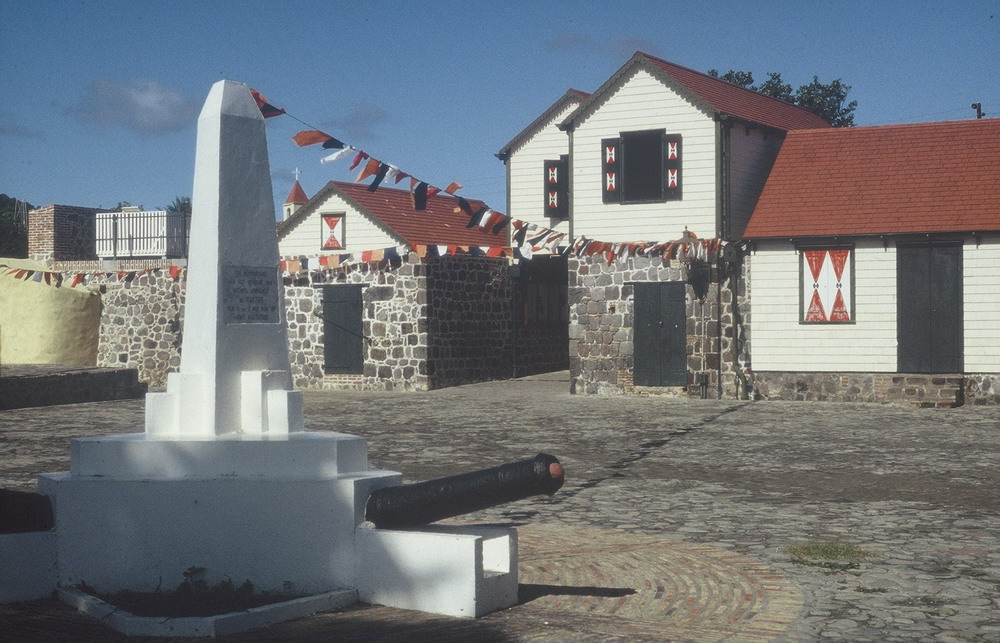
Inside the walls of Fort Oranje

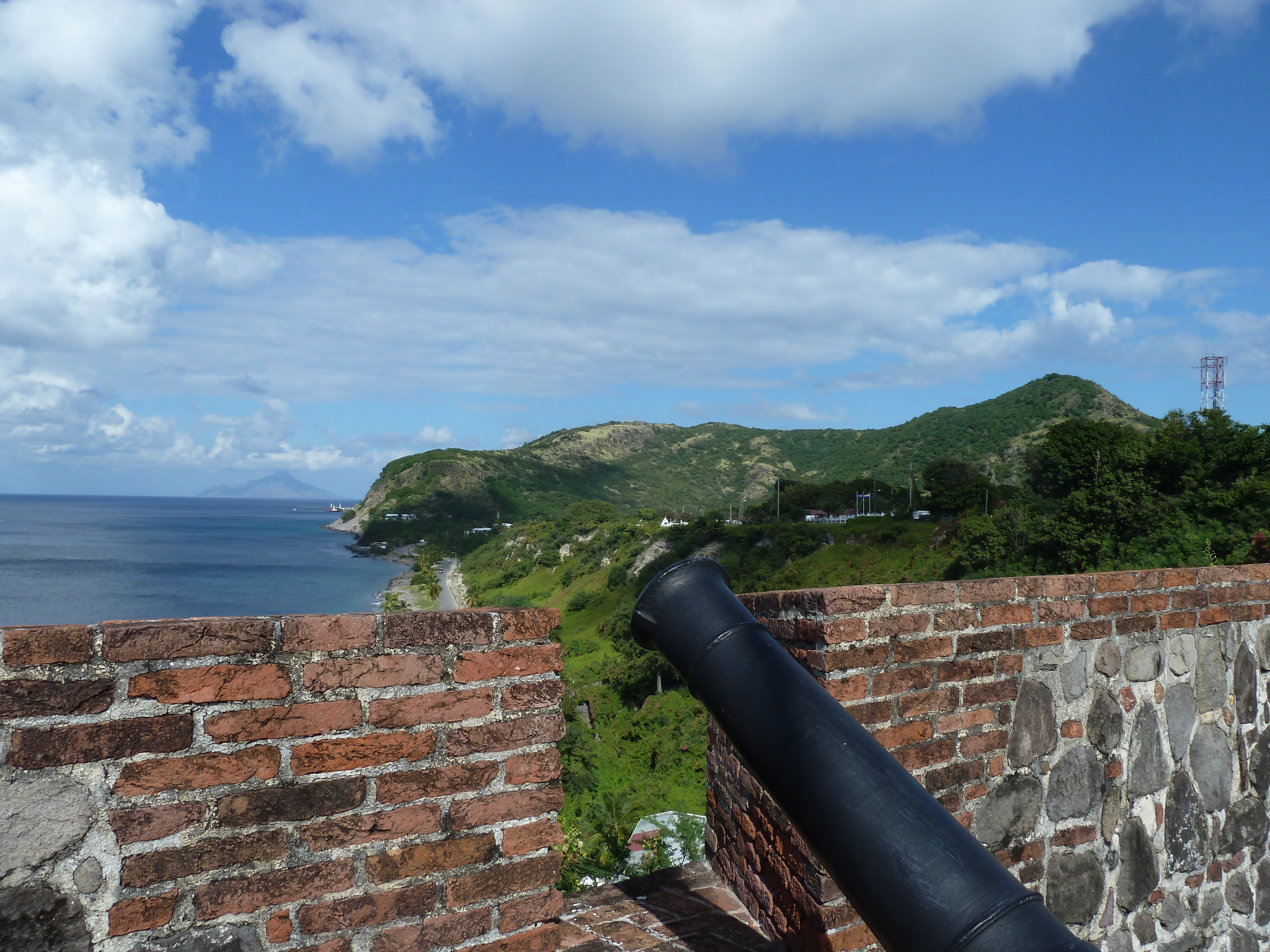
View of the island from Fort Oranje

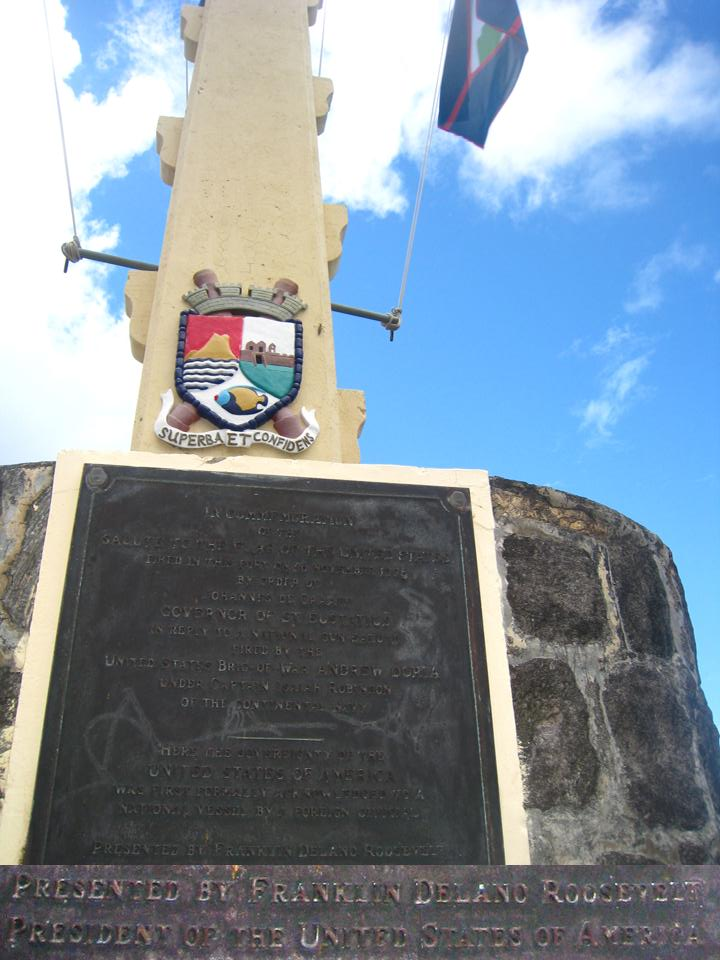
Plaque presented by Franklin D. Roosevelt in recognition of the "First Salute"

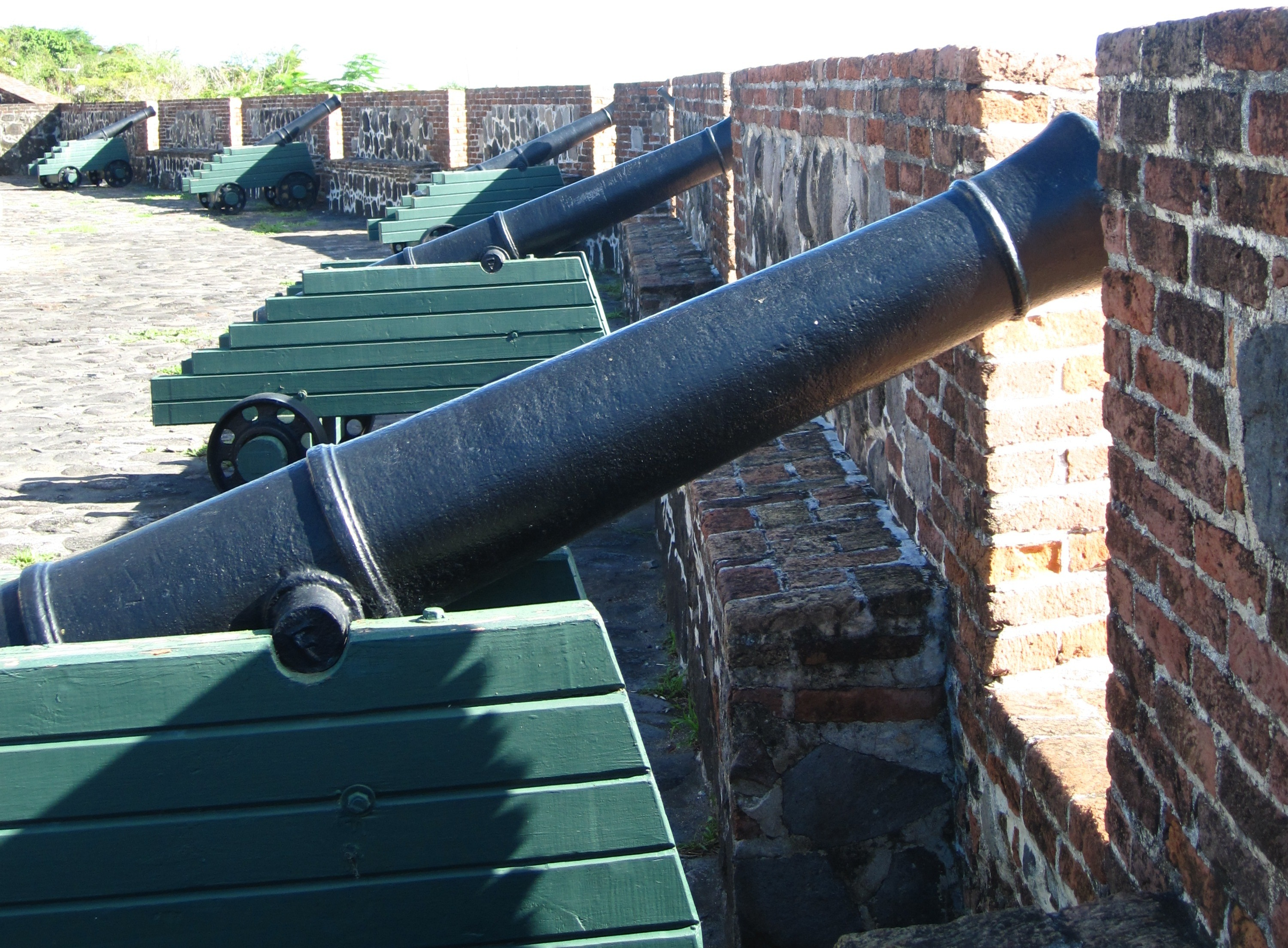
Canons at Fort Oranje

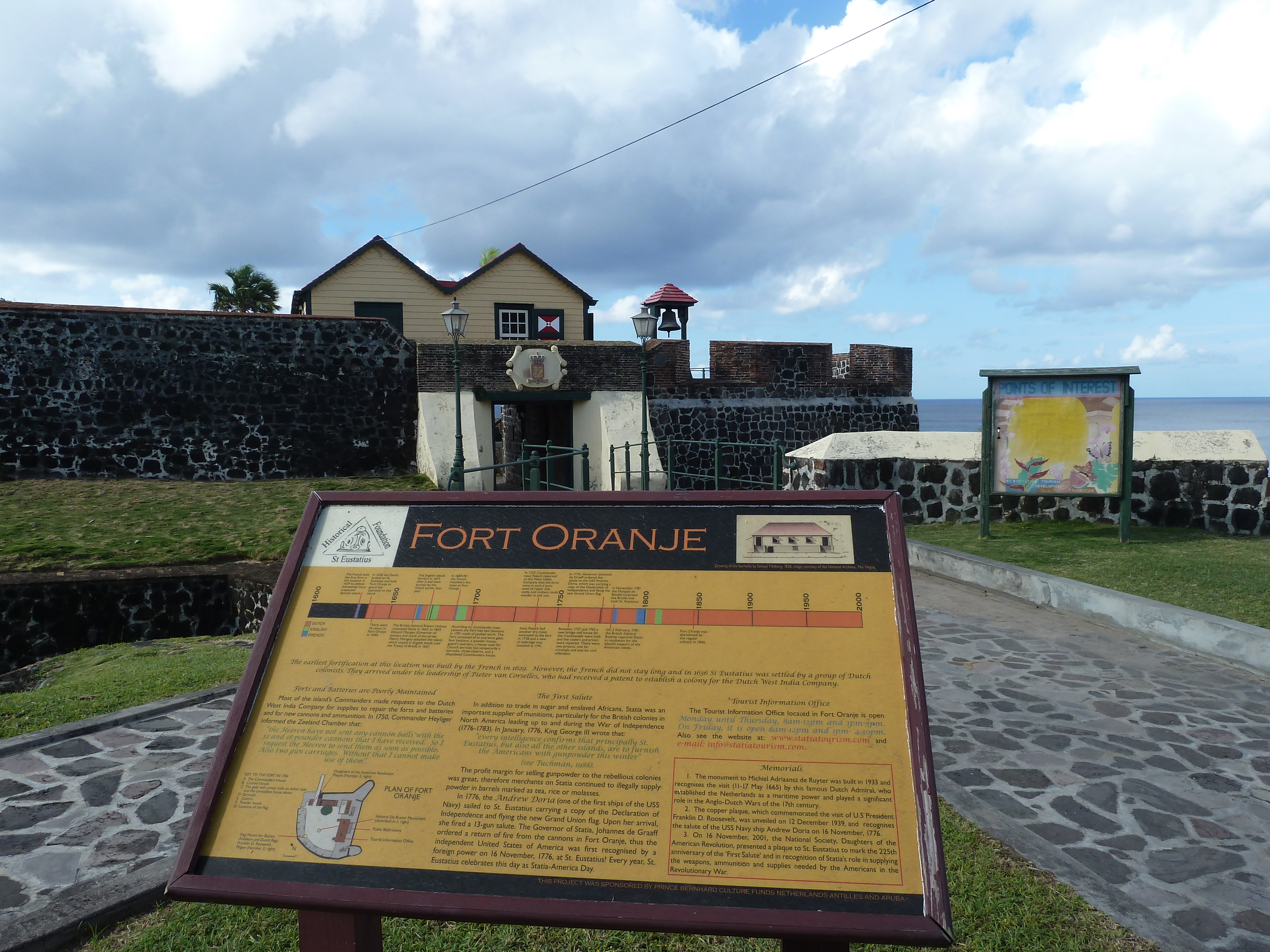
Fort Oranje timeline, located at the fort
