= Johannes de Graaff =

Dutch colonial administrator (1729-1813)

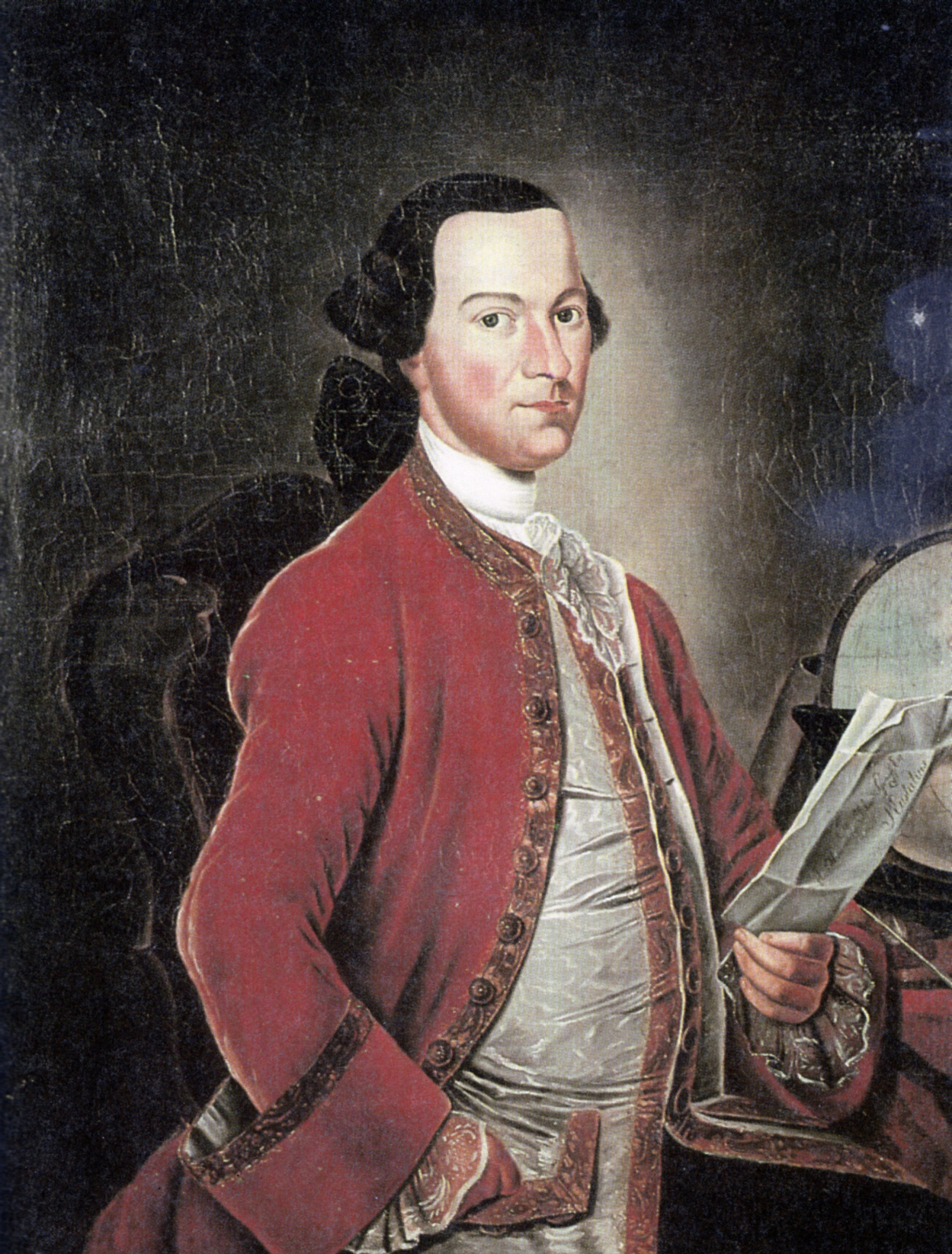

Commander of Sint Eustatius and Dependencies
- In office 1776–1781
- Preceded by: Abraham Heyliger
- Succeeded by: David Ogilvy

Personal details
- Born: 1729 Sint Eustatius
- Died: 1813 (aged 83–84) Sint Eustatius
- Party: Dutch States Party
- Spouse: Maria Heyliger
- Relations: Abraham Heyliger
- Profession: Lawyer
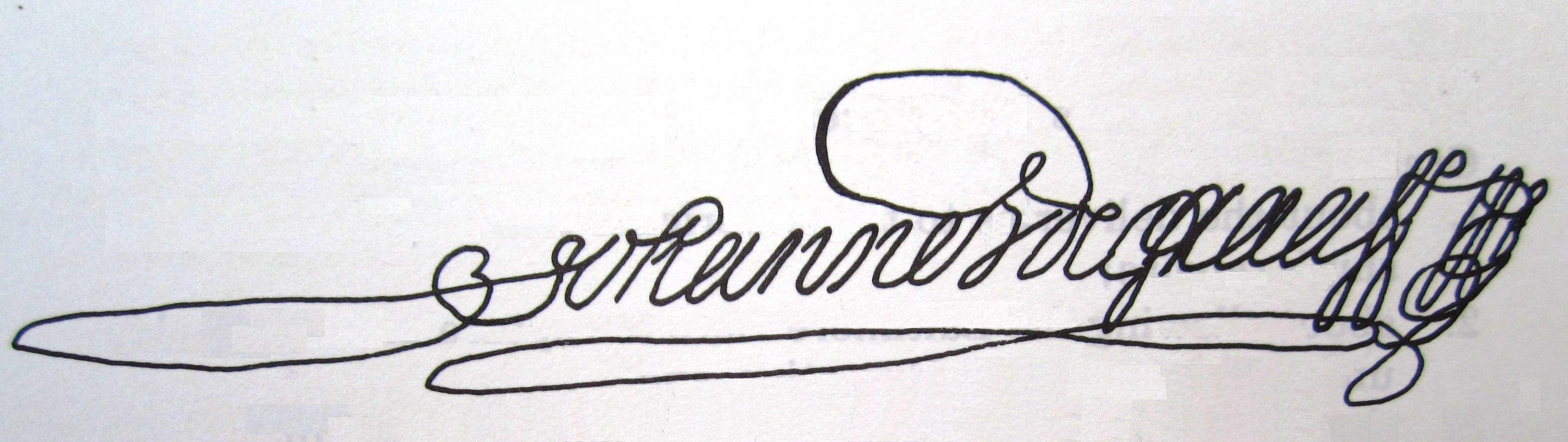
- Signature

Johannes de Graaff (1729–1813), also referred to as Johannis de Graeff in some documents, was a Dutch Governor of Sint Eustatius, Saba and Sint Maarten in the Netherlands Antilles representing the Dutch West India Company during the American Revolutionary War (1775–83). The island was a major center of contraband smuggling gunpowder to the Americans when the Dutch Republic had an official policy of embargoing trade with the Americans.

== Biography ==
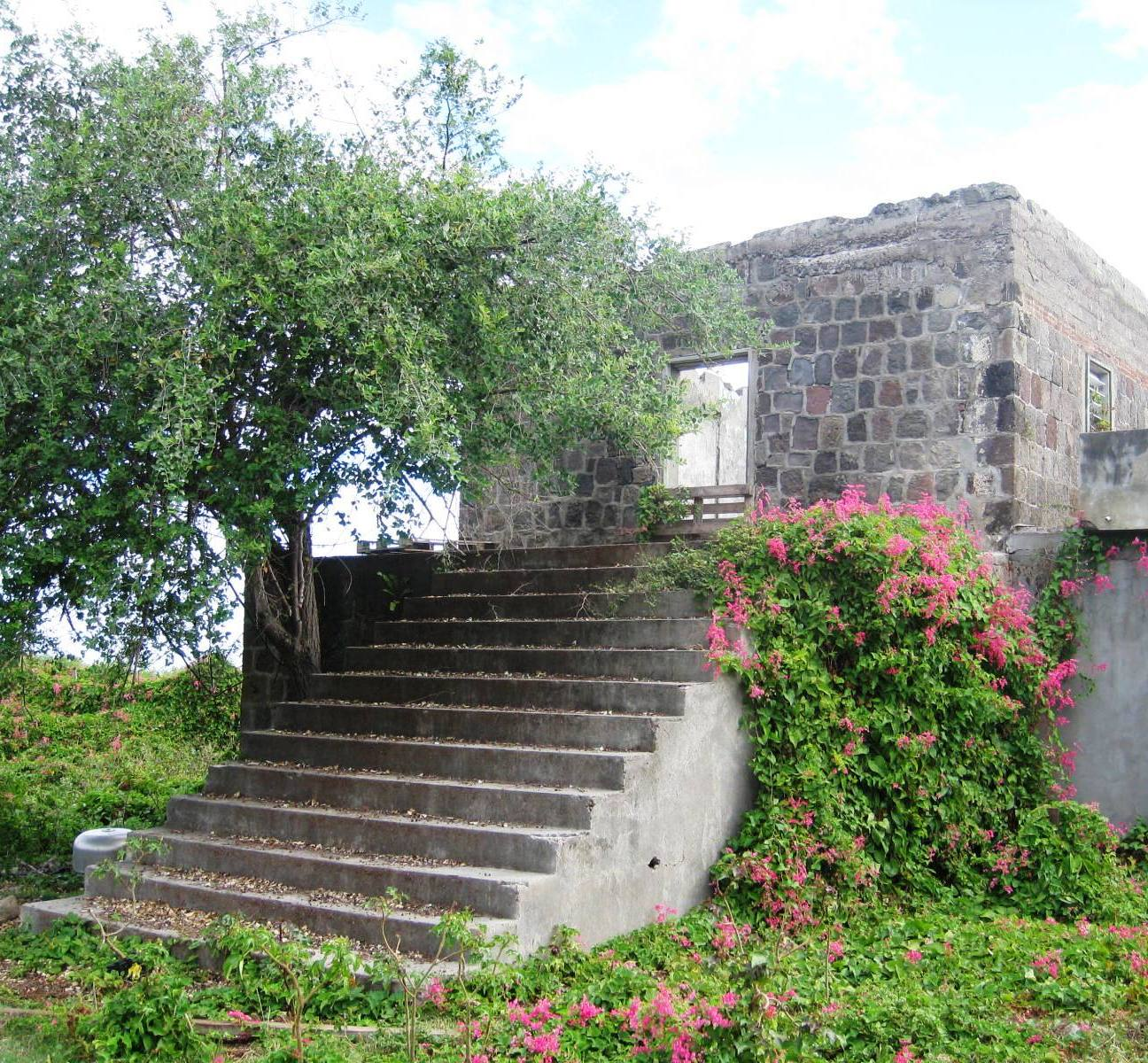
Ruins of De Graaff's estate 'Graavindal' on St. Eustatius

De Graaff was born in Sint Eustatius, the son of Simon de Graaff', a member of the island council. De Graaff received his education in the Netherlands. After he returned to Sint Eustatius, he married Maria Heyliger, a daughter of the ruling Commander (Governor) Abraham Heyliger. De Graaff started his career as a military commander of Sint Maarten. In July 1751 he was appointed as secretary on Eustatius, which became a free port in 1756 and used more intensively by the Middelburgsche Commercie Compagnie for slave trade on New Spain and the Caribbean islands. The export of sugar rose enormously, the number of ships in the harbor doubled; the island was known as the "golden rock". For some years Thomas Hope and his brother were involved in the trade on the island. De Graaff became St. Eustatius' richest man. He reportedly owned ten plantations, three hundred slaves, sixteen trading ships and a quarter of the island's real estate. He lived in an imposing villa on the bay. In July 1775, after Jan de Windt died, he promised Adrian Hope to do everything to represent Hope & Co on Eustatius. On 5 September 1776 he was made Commander (or Governor in every day parlance) of the island.

=== "First Salute" to the American Flag ===
Sint Eustatius was the most important place for dealing or smuggling with Americans. On 16 November 1776, at the beginning of the American Revolutionary War, the American navy ship USS Andrew Doria, with the American Declaration of Independence on board, arrived in St. Eustatius. Its captain fired a salute to the Dutch flag on Fort Oranje and Johannes de Graaff decided to answer the salute with eleven gunshots. And so the United States of America were for the first time recognized as a nation by this salute of eleven guns.

Great Britain was deeply angered by the illegal arms trade operating out of Sint Eustatius and the refusal of Dutch authorities to take action against it. De Graaff was eventually recalled to Holland following British protests to the Dutch government. In an accompanying letter, Henry Hope wrote that the governor would have to answer to the homeland. In 1777, the island came under a British blockade due to the illicit arms trade by the Middelburgsche Commercie Compagnie. In 1778 he explained his motivations and was sent back to Sint Eustatius in the next year.

=== Loss of island to the British ===
De Graaff held his position until British admiral Rodney, leading a large naval force, captured the island in February 1781.

=== Commentaries regarding the 'First Salute' ===
"White puffs of gun smoke over a turquoise sea followed by the boom of cannon rose from the unassuming port on the diminutive Dutch island of St. Eustatius in the West Indies on 16 November 1776. The guns of Fort Orange on St. Eustatius were returning the ritual salute on entering a foreign port of an American vessel, the Andrew Doria, as she came up the roadstead, flying at her mast the red-and-white-striped flag of the Continental Congress. In its responding salute, the small voice of St. Eustatius was the first to officially greet the largest event of the century – the entry into the society of nations of a new Atlantic state destined to change the direction of history".

In 1939, U.S. President Franklin Delano Roosevelt presented a plaque to St. Eustatius. Mounted on the flagpole inside the impressively restored Fort Oranje, it reads, "In commemoration of the salute to the flag of the United States fired in this fort on 16 November 1776 by order of Johannes de Graaff, Governor of St. Eustatius in reply to a national gun salute fired by the U.S. Brig-of-war Andrew Doria.(...) Here the sovereignty of the United States was first formally acknowledged to a national vessel by a foreign official".

Preceded by Abraham Heyliger	Governor of Sint Eustatius, Saba and Sint Maarten; 1776–1781	Succeeded by David Ogilvy
