= 1776 =

1776 in various calendars
- Gregorian calendar: 1776; MDCCLXXVI
- Ab urbe condita: 2529
- Armenian calendar: 1225; ԹՎ ՌՄԻԵ
- Assyrian calendar: 6526
- Balinese saka calendar: 1697–1698
- Bengali calendar: 1182–1183
- Berber calendar: 2726
- British Regnal year: 16 Geo. 3 – 17 Geo. 3
- Buddhist calendar: 2320
- Burmese calendar: 1138
- Byzantine calendar: 7284–7285
- Chinese calendar: 乙未年 (Wood Goat); 4473 or 4266 — to — 丙申年 (Fire Monkey); 4474 or 4267
- Coptic calendar: 1492–1493
- Discordian calendar: 2942
- Ethiopian calendar: 1768–1769
- Hebrew calendar: 5536–5537
- Hindu calendars
- Vikram Samvat: 1832–1833
- Shaka Samvat: 1697–1698
- Kali Yuga: 4876–4877
- Holocene calendar: 11776
- Igbo calendar: 776–777
- Iranian calendar: 1154–1155
- Islamic calendar: 1189–1190
- Japanese calendar: An'ei 5 (安永５年)
- Javanese calendar: 1701–1702
- Julian calendar: Gregorian minus 11 days
- Korean calendar: 4109
- Minguo calendar: 136 before ROC 民前136年
- Nanakshahi calendar: 308
- Thai solar calendar: 2318–2319
- Tibetan calendar: ཤིང་མོ་ལུག་ལོ་ (female Wood-Sheep); 1902 or 1521 or 749 — to — མེ་ཕོ་སྤྲེ་ལོ་ (male Fire-Monkey); 1903 or 1522 or 750

July 2: American Declaration of Independence is signed in Philadelphia, and ratified on July 4

1776 (MDCCLXXVI) was a leap year starting on Monday of the Gregorian calendar and a leap year starting on Friday of the Julian calendar, the 1776th year of the Common Era (CE) and Anno Domini (AD) designations, the 776th year of the 2nd millennium, the 76th year of the 18th century, and the 7th year of the 1770s decade. As of the start of 1776, the Gregorian calendar was 11 days ahead of the Julian calendar, which remained in localized use until 1923.

1776 took place during the height of the American Revolution, and was singled out by Abraham Lincoln as a turning point through the signing of the Declaration of Independence.

== Events ==
=== January–February ===
- January 1 – American Revolutionary War: Burning of Norfolk – The town of Norfolk, Virginia is destroyed, by the combined actions of the British Royal Navy and occupying Patriot forces.
- January 10 – American Revolution: Thomas Paine publishes his pamphlet Common Sense, arguing for independence from British rule in the Thirteen Colonies.
- January 20 – American Revolution: South Carolina Loyalists led by Robert Cunningham sign a petition from prison, agreeing to all demands for peace by the formed state government of South Carolina.
- January 24 – American Revolution: Henry Knox arrives at Cambridge, Massachusetts, with the artillery that he has transported from Fort Ticonderoga.
- February 17 – Edward Gibbon publishes the first volume of The History of the Decline and Fall of the Roman Empire.
- February 27 – American Revolution: Battle of Moore's Creek Bridge – Scottish North Carolina Loyalists charge across Moore's Creek Bridge near Wilmington to attack what they mistakenly believe to be a small force of rebels. Several leaders are killed in the ensuing battle. The patriot victory ends virtually all British authority in the province.

=== March–April ===
- March – Restrictions on the grain trade in Sweden are lifted.
- March 1 – The Peshwa of the Maratha Empire and the British East India Company sign the Treaty of Purandar in which the British are able to secure Salsette Island and accept Sawai Madhavrao as a new Peshwa. The Marathas agree not to recognise existence of the French in India.
- March 2–3 – American Revolutionary War:
  - Battle of Nassau: The American Continental Navy and Marines make a successful assault on Nassau, Bahamas.
  - Battle of the Rice Boats: American Patriots resist the Royal Navy on the Savannah River; British control over the Province of Georgia is lost.
- March 4 – American Revolutionary War: American Patriots capture Dorchester Heights, dominating the port of Boston.
- March 9 – Scottish economist Adam Smith publishes The Wealth of Nations in London.
- March 17 – American Revolutionary War: Threatened by Patriot cannons on Dorchester Heights, the British evacuate Boston, ending the 11‑month Siege of Boston.
- March 25 – American Revolutionary War: American Patriots conduct a Raid on Tybee Island, primarily seeking to capture runaway slaves who sought refuge with British forces stationed there.
- March 28
  - Juan Bautista de Anza finds the site for the Presidio of San Francisco.
  - Foundation of the ballet troupe which becomes the world-renowned Bolshoi Ballet in Moscow, Russian Empire.
- April 12 – American Revolution: The Royal Colony of North Carolina produces the Halifax Resolves, making it the first British colony to officially authorize its Continental Congress delegates to vote for independence from the Kingdom of Great Britain.
- April 27 – Jeongjo becomes the King of Joseon following the death of his grandfather Yeongjo.

=== May–June ===
- May 1 – Adam Weishaupt founds the Illuminati in Ingolstadt, Bavaria.
- May 4 – Rhode Island becomes the first American colony to renounce allegiance to King George III of Great Britain.
- May 15–26 – American Revolution: Battle of the Cedars – British forces skirmish with the American Continental Army around Les Cèdres, Quebec.
- June 6 – A fire destroys major parts of the town of Askersund, Sweden.
- June 7 – American Revolution: Lee Resolution – Richard Henry Lee of Virginia proposes to the Second Continental Congress (meeting in Philadelphia) that "these united colonies are, and of right ought to be, free and independent states."
- June 8 – American Revolution: Battle of Trois-Rivières – The invading American Continental Army is driven back at Trois-Rivières, Quebec.
- June 10 – Death of King Hsinbyushin of the Konbaung dynasty in Burma.
- June 11 – American Revolution: The Continental Congress appoints a Committee of Five to draft a Declaration of Independence.
- June 12 – American Revolution: The Virginia Declaration of Rights (by George Mason) is adopted by the Virginia Convention of Delegates.
- June 15 – American Revolution: Delaware Separation Day – The Delaware General Assembly votes to suspend government under the British Crown.
- June 17 – Lt. José Joaquín Moraga leads a band of colonists from Monterey Presidio, landing on June 29 and, with Father Francisco Palóu, constructing the Mission San Francisco de Asís ("Mission Dolores") of the new Presidio of San Francisco, the oldest surviving building in the modern-day city.
- June 28 – American Revolutionary War: Battle of Sullivan's Island – South Carolina militia repel a British attack on Charleston.
- June 29 – American Revolutionary War: Battle of Turtle Gut Inlet – The American Continental Navy successfully challenges the British Royal Navy blockade off New Jersey.

=== July–August ===
- July 2 – American Revolution: The Continental Congress adopts the Lee Resolution.
- July 4 – American Revolution: United States Declaration of Independence – The Continental Congress approves the declaration by the United States of its independence from the Kingdom of Great Britain. The text was drafted during June by Benjamin Franklin.
- July 4 - The Albertina art museum is founded in Vienna, Austria.
- July 8 – American Revolution: The Liberty Bell rings in Philadelphia for the first public reading of the Declaration of Independence.
- July 9 – American Revolution – An angry mob in New York City topples and beheads the equestrian statue of George III of Great Britain in Bowling Green; much of its metal content will be used to make musket balls.
- July 12 – Captain James Cook sets off from Plymouth, England, in HMS Resolution on his third voyage, to the Pacific Ocean and Arctic, which will be fatal to him.
- July 21 – Mozart's Serenade No. 7 (the "Haffner") is first performed in Salzburg, Austria.
- July 29 – Domínguez–Escalante expedition: Francisco Silvestre Vélez de Escalante, Francisco Atanasio Domínguez and eight other Spaniards set out from Santa Fe on an 1800-mile (2900 km) trek through the American Southwest. They are the first Europeans to explore the vast region between the Rockies and the Sierras.
- August 1 – The Viceroyalty of the Río de la Plata is established in southern South America.
- August 2 – Delegates of most of the American colonies sign the Declaration of Independence.
- August 15 – American Revolution: The first Hessian troops land on Staten Island, to join British forces.
- August 25 – Scottish philosopher and historian David Hume dies in Edinburgh.
- August 27 – American Revolution: Battle of Long Island – George Washington's troops are defeated in Brooklyn by the British, under William Howe.
- August – The guild organisation Marchandes de modes is founded in Paris.

=== September–October ===
- September 1 – Cherokee–American wars: The invasion of the Cherokee Nation by 6,000 patriot troops from Virginia, North Carolina, and South Carolina begins. The troops destroy 36 Cherokee towns.
- September 6 – A hurricane hits Guadeloupe, killing more than 6,000 people.
- September 7 – American Revolutionary War: World's first submarine attack – The American submersible craft Turtle attempts to attach a time bomb to the hull of British Admiral Richard Howe's flagship HMS Eagle in New York Harbor.
- September 9 – The Continental Congress officially names its union of states the United States (previously the United Colonies).
- September 11 – American Revolutionary War: An abortive peace conference takes place between the British and Americans, on Staten Island.
- September 15 – American Revolutionary War: Landing at Kip's Bay – British troops land on Manhattan at Kips Bay.

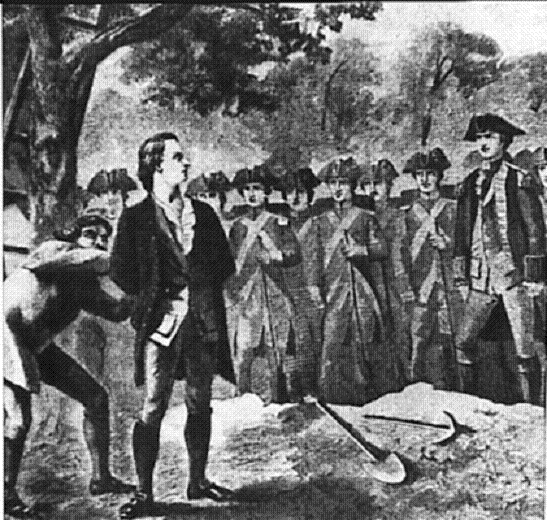
September 22: British hang spy Nathan Hale in New York City.

- September 16 – American Revolutionary War: Battle of Harlem Heights – The Continental Army under Washington is victorious against the British on Manhattan.
- September 17 – The Presidio of San Francisco is founded in New Spain.
- September 20 – The Great Fire of New York (1776) starts during the night, ending the following morning.
- September 22 – American Revolutionary War – Nathan Hale is executed by the British in New York City for espionage.
- September 24
  - The first running of the St Leger Stakes horse race (not yet named) in England, first of the British Classic Races, devised by Anthony St Leger (British Army officer), takes place on Cantley Common at Doncaster. The winner is a filly (later named Allabaculia) owned by the organiser, the 2nd Marquess of Rockingham.
  - The Bolshoi Theatre company hosts its first annual opera season, with the opening of the Bolshoi Kamenny Theatre in Saint Petersburg, Russia.
- October 7 – Crown Prince Paul of Russia marries Sophie Dorothea of Württemberg.
- October 9 – Father Francisco Palóu founds the Mission San Francisco de Asís, in what becomes San Francisco.
- October 11 – American Revolutionary War: Battle of Valcour Island – On Lake Champlain near Valcour Island, a British fleet led by Sir Guy Carleton defeats 15 American gunboats, commanded by Brigadier General Benedict Arnold. Although nearly all of Arnold's ships are destroyed, the two-day-long battle will give Patriot forces enough time to prepare the defenses of New York City.
- October 18 – American Revolutionary War: Battle of Pell's Point – Troops of the American Continental Army resist a British and Hessian force in The Bronx.
- October 28 – American Revolutionary War: Battle of White Plains – British forces arrive at White Plains, attack and capture Chatterton Hill from the Americans.
- October 31 – In his first speech before the British Parliament since the Declaration of Independence this summer, King George III acknowledges that all is not going well for Britain, in the war with the United States.

=== November–December ===
- November 16
  - American Revolutionary War: Battle of Fort Washington – Hessian forces under Lieutenant General Wilhelm von Knyphausen capture Fort Washington (Manhattan) from the American Continental Army.
  - The captain of the American navy ship Andrew Doria fires a salute to the Dutch flag on Fort Oranje, and Johannes de Graaff answers with 11 gun shots.
- November 20 – American Revolutionary War: Battle of Fort Lee – The invasion of New Jersey, by British and Hessian forces, leads to the subsequent general retreat of the American Continental Army.
- December 5 – The Phi Beta Kappa society is founded at the College of William & Mary in Virginia.
- December 6 – The General Assembly of Virginia votes to create Kentucky County as the portion of the colony's Fincastle County that is located west of the Cumberland Mountains. In 1792, the county will become the 15th state of the United States as the Commonwealth of Kentucky. The rest of Fincastle County, between the Blue Ridge Mountains and the Appalachians is divided into the first county to be named after George Washington (Washington County, Virginia) in the south along the border with the North Carolina colony, and Montgomery County in the north. The divisions take effect on December 31.
- December 7 – American Revolutionary War: The Marquis de Lafayette attempts to enter the American military as a major general.
- December 12 – The second Continental Congress ends after a session that began on May 10, 1775, and continued for 582 days.
- December 19 – American Revolution – Thomas Paine, living with Washington's troops, publishes the first in the series of pamphlets on The American Crisis in The Pennsylvania Journal, opening with the stirring phrase, "These are the times that try men's souls."
- December 21 – American Revolution: The Royal Colony of North Carolina reorganizes into the State of North Carolina after adopting its own constitution. Richard Caswell becomes the first governor of the newly formed state.

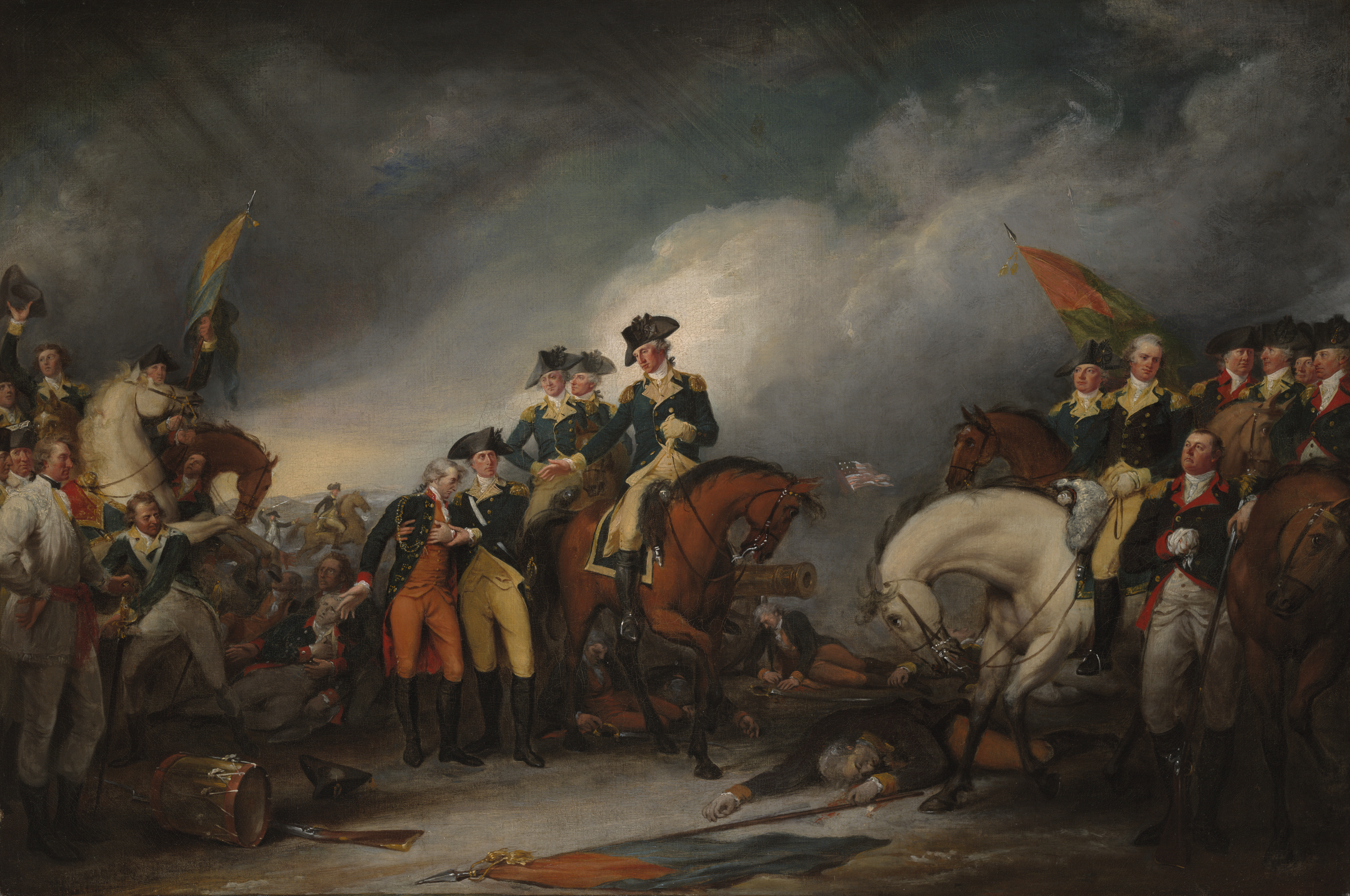
December 26: Capture of the Hessians at Trenton

- December 25 – American Revolution: George Washington's crossing of the Delaware River – At 6 p.m. Gen. George Washington and his troops, numbering 2,400, march to McConkey's Ferry, cross the Delaware River and land on the New Jersey bank by 3 a.m. the following morning.
- December 26 – American Revolutionary War: Battle of Trenton – Washington's troops surprise the 1,500 Hessian troops under the command of Col. Johann Rall at 8 a.m. outside Trenton and score a victory, taking 948 prisoners while suffering only five wounded.

=== Date unknown ===
- Adlan II becomes ruler of the Kingdom of Sennar.
- The first commercial examples of the Watt steam engine are sold.

== Births ==
- January 1 – James M. Broom, American politician (d. 1850)
- January 2 – Jeremiah Chaplin, American Reformed Baptist theologian (d. 1841)
- January 3 – Thomas Morris, American politician (d. 1844)
- January 4
  - Bernardino Drovetti, Italian diplomat (d. 1852)
  - Jean-Baptiste Prosper Jollois, French Egyptologist (d. 1842)
- January 6
  - Ferdinand von Schill, German noble (d. 1809)
  - Auguste Jean Ameil, French soldier (d. 1822)
- January 8 – Thomas Langlois Lefroy, Irish politician (d. 1869)
- January 9 – Ludwig Rhesa, Prussian scholar (d. 1840)
- January 10 – George Birkbeck, English doctor, academic and philanthropist (d. 1841)
- January 15 – Prince William Frederick, Duke of Gloucester and Edinburgh, Roman-born British prince (d. 1834)
- January 16
  - Matthew Brown, American college president (d. 1853)
  - João Soares de Albergaria de Sousa, Portuguese politician (d. 1875)
  - Richard Onslow, English archdeacon (d. 1849)
- January 17 (bapt.) – Jane Porter, English novelist (d. 1850)
- January 21
  - Poul Christian Holst, Norwegian politician (d. 1863)
  - Elisha Haley, American politician (d. 1860)
- January 23 – Howard Douglas, British Army general (d. 1861)
- January 24
  - Jean-Guillaume, baron Hyde de Neuville, French aristocrat (d. 1857)
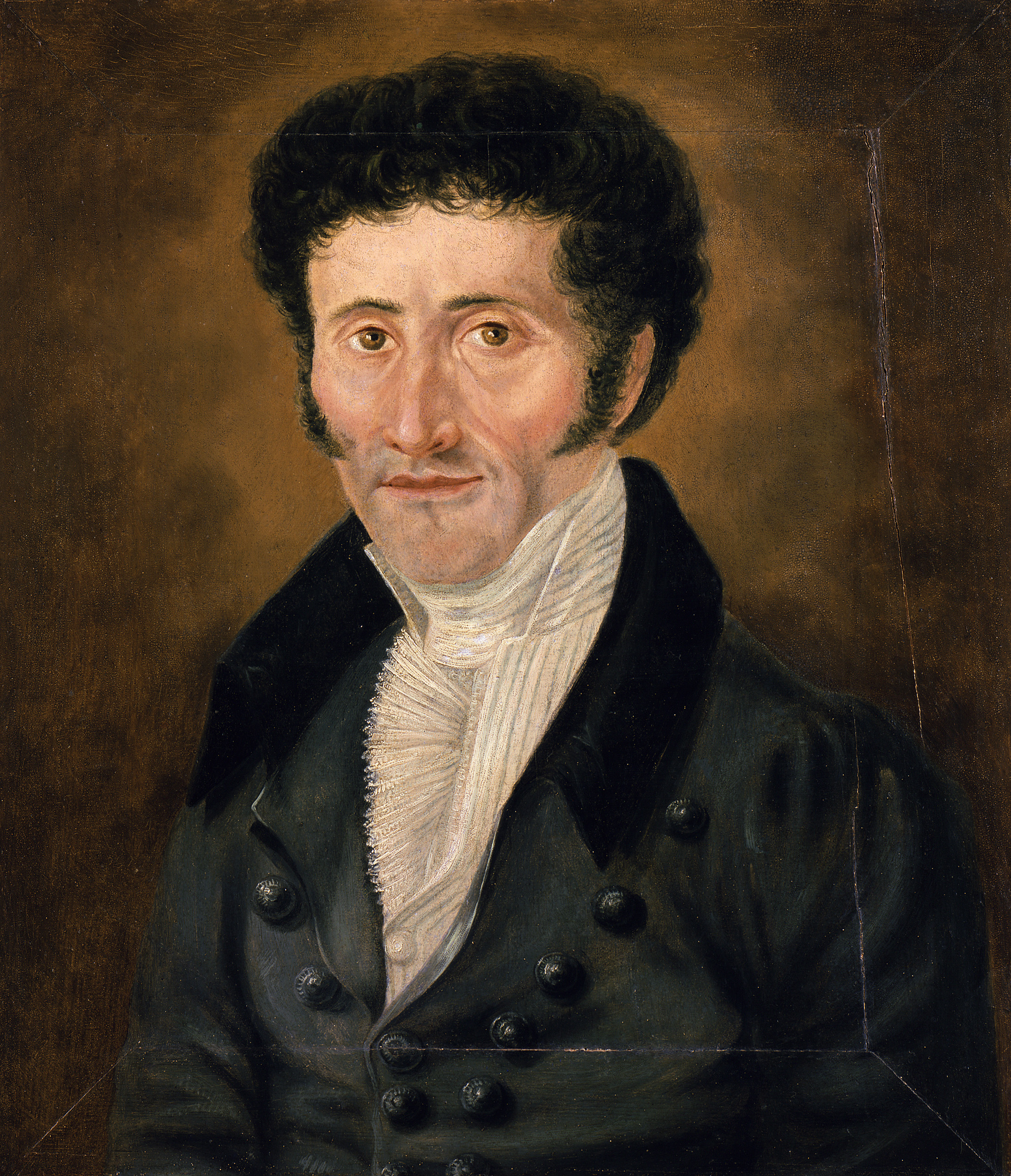
    E. T. A. Hoffmann
  - E. T. A. Hoffmann, German writer, composer and painter (d. 1822)
  - Peter A. Jay, American politician (d. 1843)
- January 25 – Joseph Görres, German writer and journalist (d. 1848)
- January 29 – William Bowie, American agrarian (d. 1826)
- February 4
  - Gottfried Reinhold Treviranus, German biologist (d. 1837)
  - Jan Gerard Kemmerling, Dutch mayor (d. 1818)
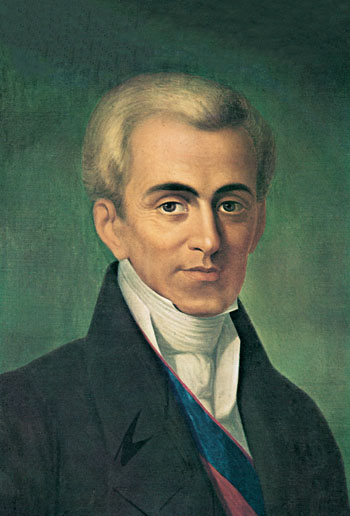
    Ioannis Kapodistrias
- February 11 – Ioannis Kapodistrias, Governor of Greece (d. 1831)
- February 12
  - Richard Mant, Irish bishop (d. 1848)
  - Mary Young Pickersgill, American maker of the Star Spangled Banner flag (d. 1857)
- February 14 – Christian Gottfried Daniel Nees von Esenbeck, prolific German botanist (d. 1858)
- February 15 – Jean-Pierre Boyer, President of Haiti (d. 1850)
- February 16 – Abraham Raimbach, British engraver (d. 1843)
- February 17
  - Ross Cuthbert, Canadian politician (d. 1861)
  - Georg zu Münster, German paleontologist (d. 1844)
- February 18 – Karl August Ferdinand von Borcke, German general (d. 1830)
- February 20 – Mariano Ricafort Palacín y Abarca, Spanish colonial governor of Cuba (d. 1846)
- February 21 – Joseph Barss, Canadian privateer, sea captain (d. 1824)
- February 23
  - John Walter, English newspaper editor (d. 1847)
  - Heneage Horsley, Scottish priest (d. 1847)
- February 25 – George William Tighe, English expatriate (d. 1837)
- February 26
  - Innis Green, American congressman for Pennsylvania (d. 1839)
  - John Paterson, Scottish missionary to Northern Europe (d. 1855)
- February 28 – François Quirouet, Canadian politician (d. 1844)
- March 1
  - John Collins, American manufacturer, politician (d. 1822)
  - Elias Moore (d. 1847)
- March 3 – James Parker, American politician (d. 1868)
- March 4 – Guillaume Emmanuel Guignard, vicomte de Saint-Priest, Russian army commander (d. 1814)
- March 5 – Gerard Troost, American mineralogist (d. 1850)
- March 6 – Luigi Lambruschini, Italian Catholic cardinal (d. 1854)
- March 7 – Timothy Ruggles, Canadian politician (d. 1831)
- March 8
  - David Rogerson Williams, American politician (d. 1830)
  - Samuel Tweedy, American politician (d. 1868)
- March 9
  - Thomas Evans, British Army general (d. 1863)
  - Archduke Joseph, Palatine of Hungary, Archduke of Austria (d. 1847)
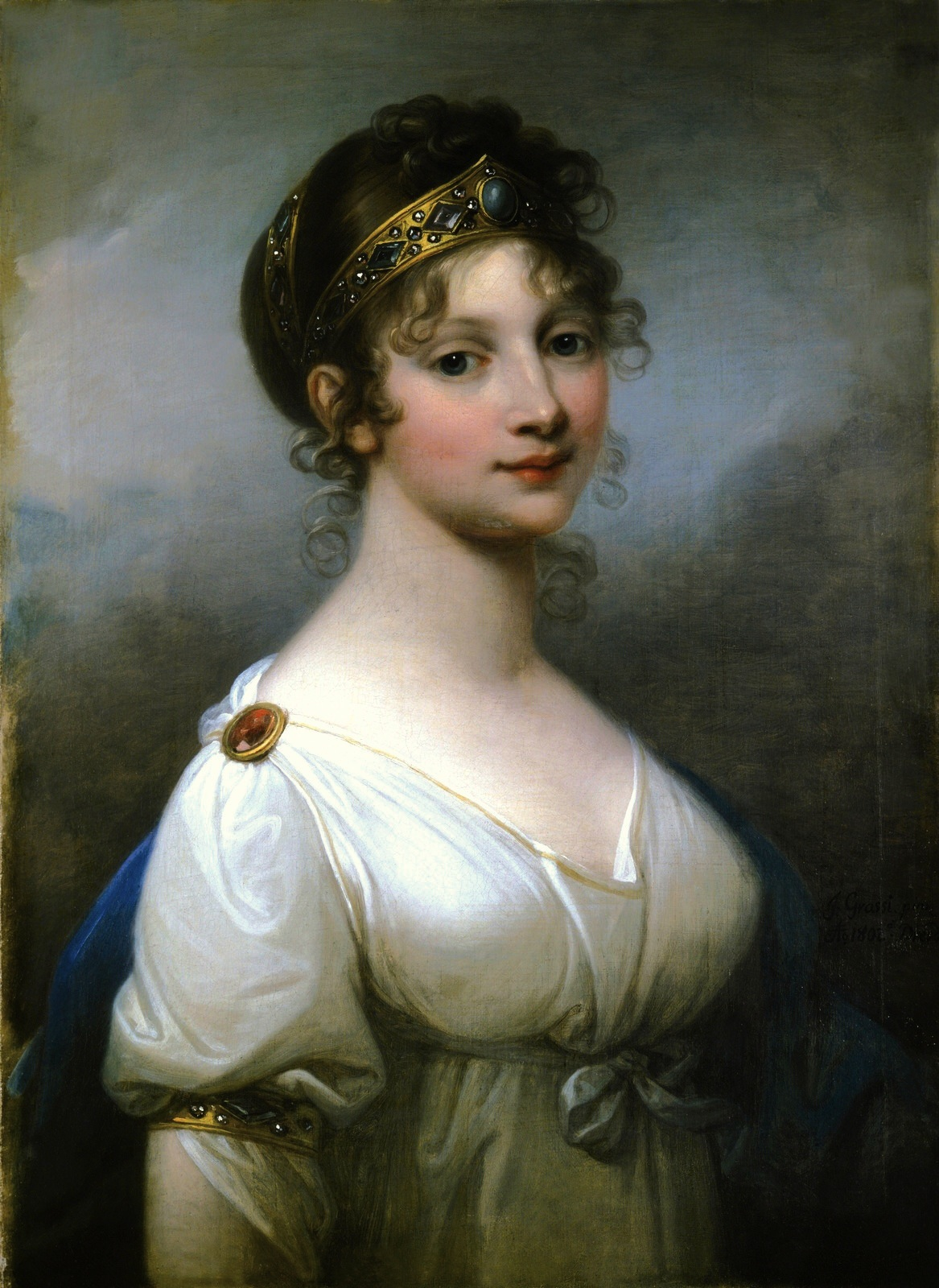
    Louise of Mecklenburg-Strelitz
- March 10
  - Louise of Mecklenburg-Strelitz, Queen of Prussia (d. 1810)
  - Étienne Ranvoyzé, Canadian politician (d. 1826)
- March 12 – Lady Hester Stanhope, English archaeologist (d. 1839)
- March 16 – Johan Gijsbert Verstolk van Soelen, Dutch Minister of Foreign Affairs (d. 1845)
- March 15 – Aimé Picquet du Boisguy, French chouan general during the French Revolution (d. 1839)
- March 17 – Joel Abbot, American politician (d. 1826)
- March 19 – Philemon Beecher, American politician (d. 1839)
- March 20
  - Joshua Bates, American educator (d. 1854)
  - Richard Temple-Nugent-Brydges-Chandos-Grenville, 1st Duke of Buckingham and Chandos, English politician (d. 1839)
- March 21 – John Frederick Frelinghuysen, United States general (d. 1833)
- March 23
  - Robert Eden Duncombe Shafto, English politician (d. 1848)
  - Vicente Salias, Venezuelan doctor (d. 1814)
- March 24 – Zusho Hirosato, Japanese samurai (d. 1849)
- March 27 – Charles-François Brisseau de Mirbel, French botanist, politician (d. 1854)
- March 30 – Vasily Tropinin, Russian artist (d. 1857)
- March 31 – Joseph Küffner, German musician, composer (d. 1856)
- April 1
  - Pierre François Bellot, Swiss jurist (d. 1836)
  - Sophie Germain, French mathematician (d. 1831)
- April 3
  - François Blanchet, Canadian physician, politician (d. 1830)
  - Mary Anne Clarke, English mistress of Prince Frederick (d. 1852)
- April 6 – Jesse Bledsoe, American politician (d. 1836)
- April 11
  - Macvey Napier, Scottish legal scholar, one of the editors of the Encyclopædia Britannica (d. 1847)
  - Jerome Inglott, Maltese philosopher (d. 1835)
- April 12
  - Henry Hezekiah Cogswell, Canadian politician (d. 1854)
  - Henry Hobhouse, English archivist (d. 1854)
- April 13 – Wilhelm von Schütz, German author, playwright (d. 1847)
- April 15 – John Anstruther-Thomson, Scottish nobleman, Colonel of the Royal Fifeshire Yeomanry Cavalry (d. 1833)
- April 17 – Jean-François Roger, French poet, politician (d. 1842)
- April 20
  - Augustin-Marie d'Aboville, French artillerist during the Revolution (d. 1843)
  - William Weston Young, English Quaker businessman (d. 1847)
- April 25
  - James Miller, American politician (d. 1851)
  - Edward Solly, English merchant, art collector (d. 1844)
  - Princess Mary, Duchess of Gloucester and Edinburgh, member of the British Royal Family (d. 1857)
- April 27
  - Hyacinthe Jadin, French composer (d. 1800)
  - John Cunningham, Canadian politician (d. 1847)
- April 28
  - Charles Bennet, 5th Earl of Tankerville, English politician (d. 1859)
  - Manuel Vieira de Albuquerque Touvar, Portuguese nobleman (d. 1833)
- May 4 – Johann Friedrich Herbart, German philosopher, psychologist (d. 1841)
- May 5 – Valentine Efner, American politician (d. 1865)
- May 6
  - Stephen Rumbold Lushington, English politician, administrator in Madras (d. 1868)
  - Pyotr Mikhailovich Volkonsky, Russian field marshal (d. 1852)
  - Rensselaer Westerlo, American politician (d. 1851)
- May 8
  - Edward Leveson-Gower, British Royal Navy admiral (d. 1853)
  - Prince Bagrat of Georgia (d. 1841)
- May 9 – Thomas Maguire, Canadian Catholic priest (d. 1854)
- May 10 – George Thomas Smart, English musician (d. 1867)
- May 12 – José de La Mar, military leader, President of Peru (d. 1830)
- May 13 – Jett Thomas, American militia general (d. 1817)
- May 17 – Amos Eaton, American botanist (d. 1842)
- May 18 – Dennis Pennington, American politician (d. 1854)
- May 20
  - Simon Fraser, Canadian explorer (d. 1862)
  - Víctor Rosales, Mexican rebel (d. 1817)
- May 29 – Peter Erasmus Müller, Danish historian, linguist and theologian (d. 1834)
- May 31 – José Antonio de la Garza, American mayor (d. 1851)
- June 1
  - George Schetky, American conductor (d. 1831)
  - Giuseppe Zamboni, Italian Catholic priest, physicist (d. 1846)
- June 4 – Isaac B. Van Houten, American politician (d. 1850)
- June 6 – William Reed, American politician (d. 1837)
- June 8 – Thomas Rickman, English architect, architectural antiquary (d. 1841)
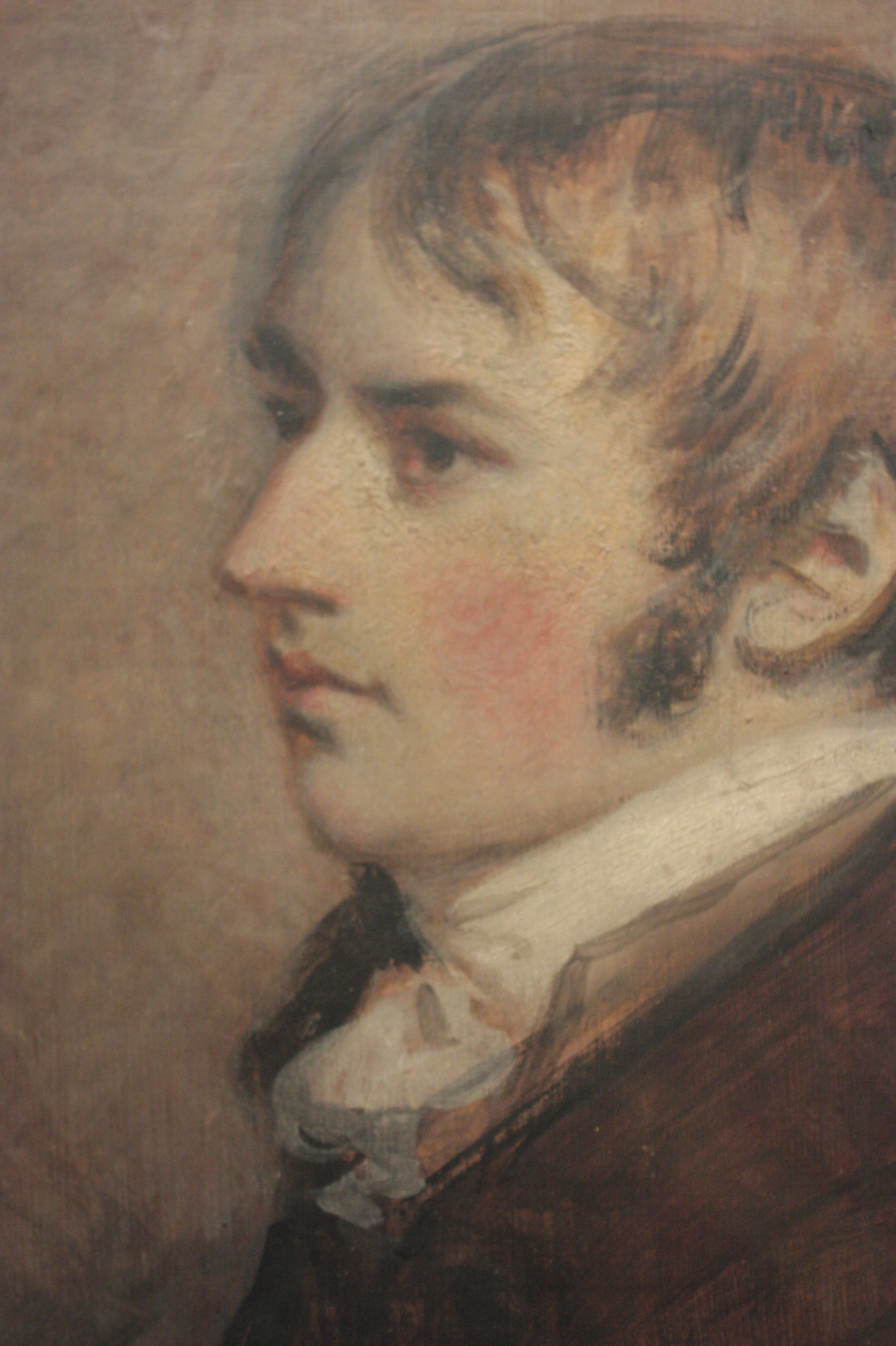
  John Constable
- June 11 – John Constable, English landscape painter (d. 1837)
- June 12
  - Karl Friedrich Burdach, German physiologist (d. 1847)
  - José Manuel de Goyeneche, 1st Count of Guaqui, Spanish soldier, diplomat (d. 1846)
  - Pierre Révoil, French painter (d. 1842)
- June 19 – Francis Johnson, American politician (d. 1842)
- June 21
  - Landgravine Josepha of Fürstenberg-Weitra, Princess of Liechtenstein (d. 1848)
  - Charles Horsfall, English merchant, politician (d. 1846)
  - William Wadd, English surgeon, medical author (d. 1829)
- June 23 – Stephen Longfellow, American politician (d. 1849)
- June 28 – Charles Mathews, English actor (d. 1835)
- June 29 – George Okill Stuart, Canadian clergyman (d. 1862)
- July 1
  - Samuel Thatcher, American politician (d. 1872)
  - Sophie Gay, French author (d. 1852)
- July 3 – Henry Parnell, 1st Baron Congleton, Anglo-Irish politician (d. 1842)
- July 4
  - Pär Aron Borg, Swedish sign language creator (d. 1839)
  - Ethan Allen Brown, American politician (d. 1852)
- July 5
  - Daniel Dobbins, captain in the United States Revenue Cutter Service (d. 1856)
  - Bernard Smith, American politician (d. 1835)
- July 10 – Samuel Powell, American politician (d. 1841)
- July 11 – William Bradbery, English entrepreneur (d. 1860)
- July 12 – John Christian, Manx judge (d. 1852)
- July 13 – Caroline of Baden, Queen of Bavaria (d. 1841)
- July 14 – Pierre Yrieix Daumesnil, French soldier (d. 1832)
- July 16
  - Ludwig Heinrich Bojanus, German physician, naturalist (d. 1827)
  - Johann Georg von Soldner, German physicist (d. 1833)
- July 17 – John Neilson, Canadian politician (d. 1848)
- July 18 – John Struthers, Scottish poet (d. 1853)
- July 20 – Ignaz Schuppanzigh, Austrian musician (d. 1830)
- July 22
  - Etheldred Benett, English geologist (d. 1845)
  - Friedrich Hermann Otto, Prince of Hohenzollern-Hechingen (d. 1838)
- July 26 – Pierre Fouquier, French physician, professor of medicine (d. 1850)
- July 29 – James McSherry, American politician (d. 1849)
- July 30 – Sir Edward Kerrison, 1st Baronet, British general (d. 1853)
- August 1
  - Archibald Acheson, 2nd Earl of Gosford, Governor General of British North America (1835–1837) (d. 1849)
  - Jean Corbineau, French cavalry general (d. 1848)
- August 2
  - Thomas Assheton Smith II, English cricketer (d. 1858)
  - Friedrich Stromeyer, German chemist (d. 1835)
- August 4 – Pierre-Simon Ballanche, French writer and counterrevolutionary philosopher (d. 1847)
- August 5
  - Sophie d'Artois, French princess (d. 1783)
  - John Willson, Canadian judge (d. 1860)
- August 6 – William Crooks, Canadian politician (d. 1836)
- August 9
  - Jacob Munch, Norwegian painter, military officer (d. 1839)
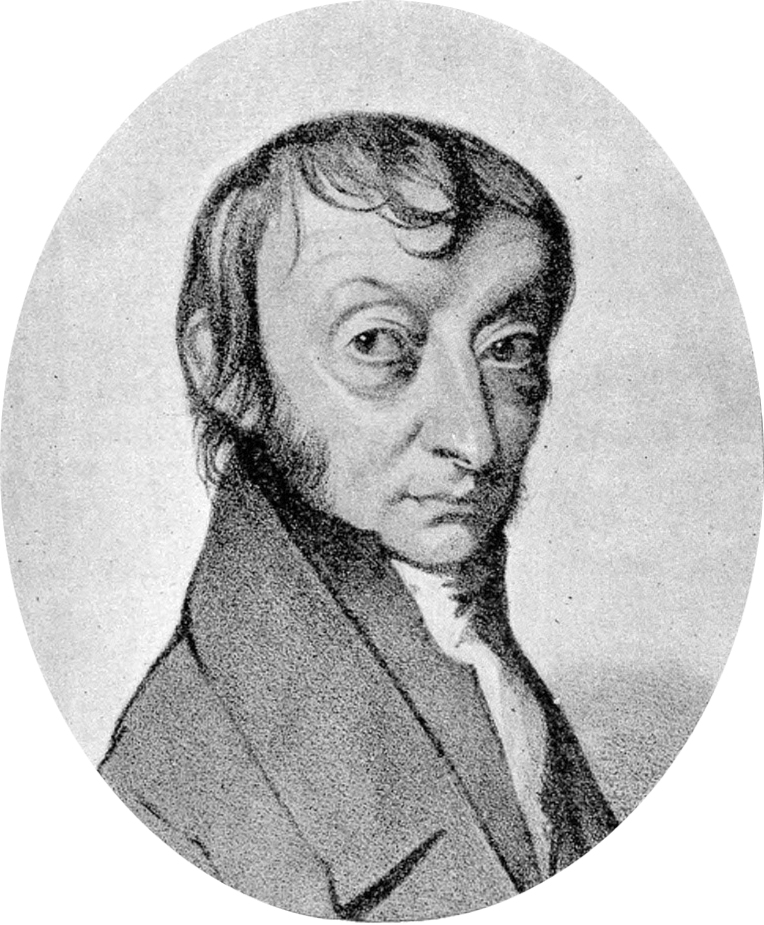
    Amedeo Avogadro
  - Amedeo Avogadro, Italian chemist (d. 1856)
- August 12
  - Thomas Millidge, Jr., New Brunswick businessman, political figure (d. 1838)
  - David Erskine, 2nd Baron Erskine, British politician (d. 1855)
- August 13 – Abraham Shepherd, American politician (d. 1847)
- August 14
  - Prince Christian of Hesse (d. 1814)
  - Christian Friedrich Tieck, German sculptor (d. 1851)
- August 15
  - Ignaz von Seyfried, Austrian musician (d. 1841)
  - Gottlieb Schick, German artist (d. 1812)
- August 16
  - Amalia von Helvig, German and Swedish artist (d. 1831)
  - Philipp Jakob Riotte, German composer (d. 1856)
  - Monaldo Leopardi, Italian philosopher (d. 1847)
  - Jean-Roch Coignet, French soldier (d. 1865)
- August 18
  - Agustín Argüelles, Spanish liberal politician (d. 1844)
  - Thomas Howard, 16th Earl of Suffolk, England (d. 1851)
  - Sir Robert Newman, 1st Baronet, English politician (d. 1848)
- August 21
  - Joseph Healy, American politician (d. 1861)
  - Elizabeth Parke Custis Law, American matriarch (d. 1832)
- August 22 – Carlo Amati, Italian architect (d. 1852)
- August 23
  - Jens Peter Debes, Norwegian politician (d. 1832)
  - Józef Maria Hoene-Wroński, Polish philosopher (d. 1853)
- August 25 – Thomas Bladen Capel, British admiral (d. 1853)
- August 26
  - Ferdynand Stokowski, Polish general (d. 1827)
  - Henry A. Livingston, American politician (d. 1849)
- August 27 – Barthold Georg Niebuhr, Danish-German statesman, historian (d. 1831)
- August 29 – Georg Friedrich Treitschke, German librettist (d. 1842)
- September 1
  - Jacques Gervais, baron Subervie, French general, politician (d. 1856)
  - Ezekiel Bacon, American politician (d. 1870)
- September 3 – Étienne Mayrand, Canadian politician (d. 1872)
- September 4 – Stephen Whitney, American merchant (d. 1860)
- September 5 – Augustus Simon Frazer, French-born British Army officer (d. 1835)
- September 8
  - Amelia of Nassau-Weilburg, German noblewoman (d. 1841)
  - Heinrich Meldahl, Norwegian builder (d. 1840)
- September 9
  - Parmenio Adams, American politician (d. 1832)
  - Calvin Pease, Ohio jurist, legislator (d. 1839)
  - Philip Broke, British Royal Navy admiral (d. 1841)
- September 11 – Thomas Arbuthnot, British Army general (d. 1849)
- September 15
  - William Baylies, American politician (d. 1865)
  - Calvin Willey, American politician (d. 1858)
- September 17 – Langdon Cheves, American politician (d. 1857)
- September 18 – Thomas Gleadowe-Newcomen, 2nd Viscount Newcomen, English politician (d. 1825)
- September 21
  - Karl Gustav Bonuvier, Swedish actor, theatre director (d. 1858)
  - John Fitchett, English poet (d. 1838)
- September 27
  - Peter Shaver, Canadian politician (d. 1866)
  - Maria Versfelt, Dutch writer, actor (d. 1845)
- October 1 – Augustus Warren Baldwin, Upper Canada naval officer, political figure (d. 1866)
- October 3 – Thomas Walsh, Vicar Apostolic of England and Wales (d. 1849)
- October 4
  - Giovanni Battista Bellé, Italian Bishop of Mantova (d. 1844)
  - Antonio Tosti, Italian cardinal-priest (d. 1866)
  - Mariano Lagasca, Spanish botanist (d. 1839)
- October 6
  - Hirata Atsutane, Japanese theologian of the Shintō religion (d. 1843)
  - James Duff, 4th Earl Fife, Scottish-born Spanish general (d. 1857)
  - James Stuart-Wortley, 1st Baron Wharncliffe, English politician (d. 1845)
- October 8 – Pieter van Os, Dutch painter, engraver (d. 1839)
- October 12 – Jean-Michel Mahé, French Navy officer, captain (d. 1833)
- October 13
  - Peter Barlow, English mathematician (d. 1862)
  - John Gibb, Scottish civil engineering contractor (d. 1850)
- October 14
  - Samuel Rexford, New York politician (d. 1857)
  - Robert Townsend Farquhar, British colonial administrator (d. 1830)
- October 18 – Cowles Mead, American politician (d. 1844)
- October 20 – John Rolls of The Hendre, British judge (d. 1837)
- October 21 – George Izard, United States general (d. 1828)
- October 22 – Edward Draper, British military officer, civil servant in Mauritius (d. 1841)
- October 25 – Patrick Neill, Scottish printer, horticulturalist (d. 1851)
- October 28 – Joachim Haspinger, Catholic priest, leader of the Tyrolese revolt against Napoleon (d. 1858)
- October 30
  - George M. Bibb, American politician (d. 1859)
  - John Hahn, American politician (d. 1823)
- October 31 – Francis Locke Jr., American politician (d. 1823)
- November 1 – Abraham McClellan, American politician (d. 1851)
- November 5 – Abraham Teerlink, Dutch painter (d. 1857)
- November 7
  - Bartow White, American politician (d. 1862)
  - James Abercromby, 1st Baron Dunfermline, British politician (d. 1858)
- November 10
  - Samuel Gross, American politician (d. 1839)
  - Henry Seymour (Knoyle), British politician (d. 1849)
  - General Washington Johnston, American politician (d. 1833)
- November 11 – Philip E. Thomas, American banker, railroad executive (d. 1861)
- November 14 – Henri Dutrochet, French physician (d. 1847)
- November 15
  - Aaron Manby, English civil engineer, founder of the Horseley Ironworks (d. 1850)
  - Pehr Henrik Ling, Swedish physical therapist (d. 1839)
- November 17
  - Friedrich Christoph Schlosser, German historian (d. 1861)
  - Robert Trimble, Associate Justice of the Supreme Court of the United States (d. 1828)
- November 20
  - William Blackwood, Scottish publisher (d. 1834)
  - Maximilian Seyssel d'Aix, German general (d. 1855)
- November 24
  - Jean-Joseph Marcel, French printer and engineer (d. 1854)
  - Matthew John Tierney, Irish surgeon (d. 1845)
- November 29 – Harcourt Lees, Irish clergyman, political pamphleteer (d. 1852)
- November 30
  - Philippe André de Vilmorin, French horticulturist (d. 1862)
  - Bartholomew Frere, English diplomat (d. 1851)
- December 1
  - Elijah H. Mills, American politician (d. 1829)
  - Isaac Lacey, American politician (d. 1844)
- December 2 – Louis Alexis Baudoin, French naval officer (d. 1805)
- December 3
  - Yashwantrao Holkar, Ruler of Holkar State (d. 1811)
  - Nicolas Charles Seringe, French physician, botanist (d. 1858)
- December 5 – Konrad Johann Martin Langenbeck, German surgeon (d. 1851)
- December 6 – Theodorick Bland, United States federal judge (d. 1846)
- December 7 – Reuben Whallon, American politician (d. 1843)
- December 8
  - Theodore Dehon, second Episcopal Bishop of South Carolina (d. 1817)
  - William Logan, American politician (d. 1822)
- December 10
  - Archduchess Maria Leopoldine of Austria-Este, second wife of Charles Theodore (d. 1848)
  - David Marchand, American politician (d. 1832)
  - Abraham Mendelssohn Bartholdy, German banker, father of classical composer Felix Mendelssohn Bartholdy (d. 1835)
- December 12 – Nicholas Conyngham Tindal, English lawyer, politician (d. 1846)
- December 13 – James Hawkes, American politician (d. 1865)
- December 14 – Ingelbrecht Knudssøn, Norwegian politician (d. 1826)
- December 16
  - Narciso Durán, Spanish Franciscan missionary to Mexico (d. 1846)
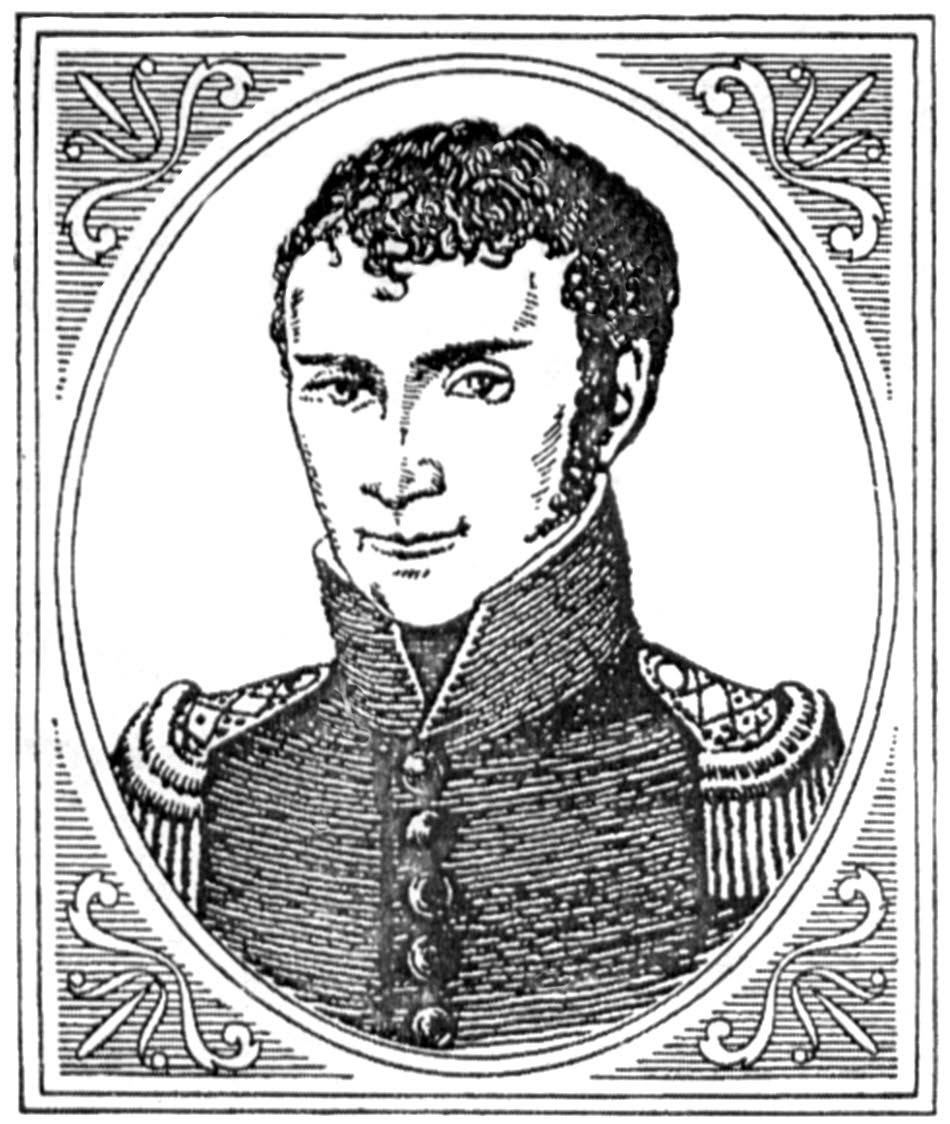
    Johann Wilhelm Ritter
  - Johann Wilhelm Ritter, German chemist (d. 1810)
- December 19
  - Lord Edward Somerset, British Army general (d. 1842)
  - Lars Roverud, Norwegian musician (d. 1850)
  - Eusebio Bardají y Azara, Prime Minister of Spain (d. 1842)
- December 20 – José María del Castillo y Rada, President of Colombia (d. 1833)
- December 25 – John Slater, American businessman (d. 1843)
- December 26 – Charles Hamilton Smith, British artist (d. 1859)
- December 27 – Nikolay Kamensky, Russian general (d. 1811)
- December 29 – Gustaf af Wetterstedt, Swedish politician (d. 1837)
- December 30 – William Drayton, American politician (d. 1846)
- December 31 – Johann Spurzheim, German physician (d. 1832)

== Deaths ==
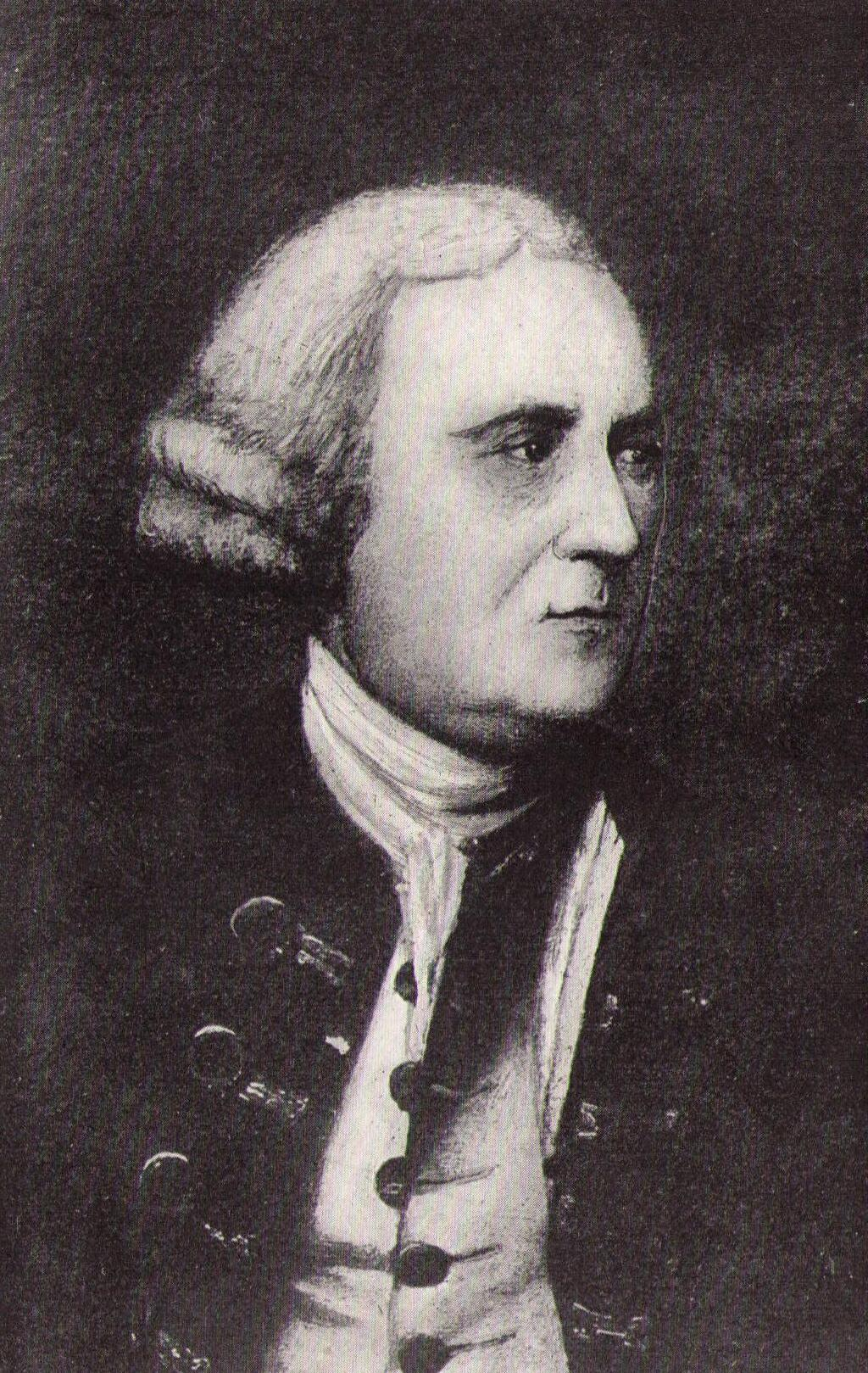
James Gabriel Montresor

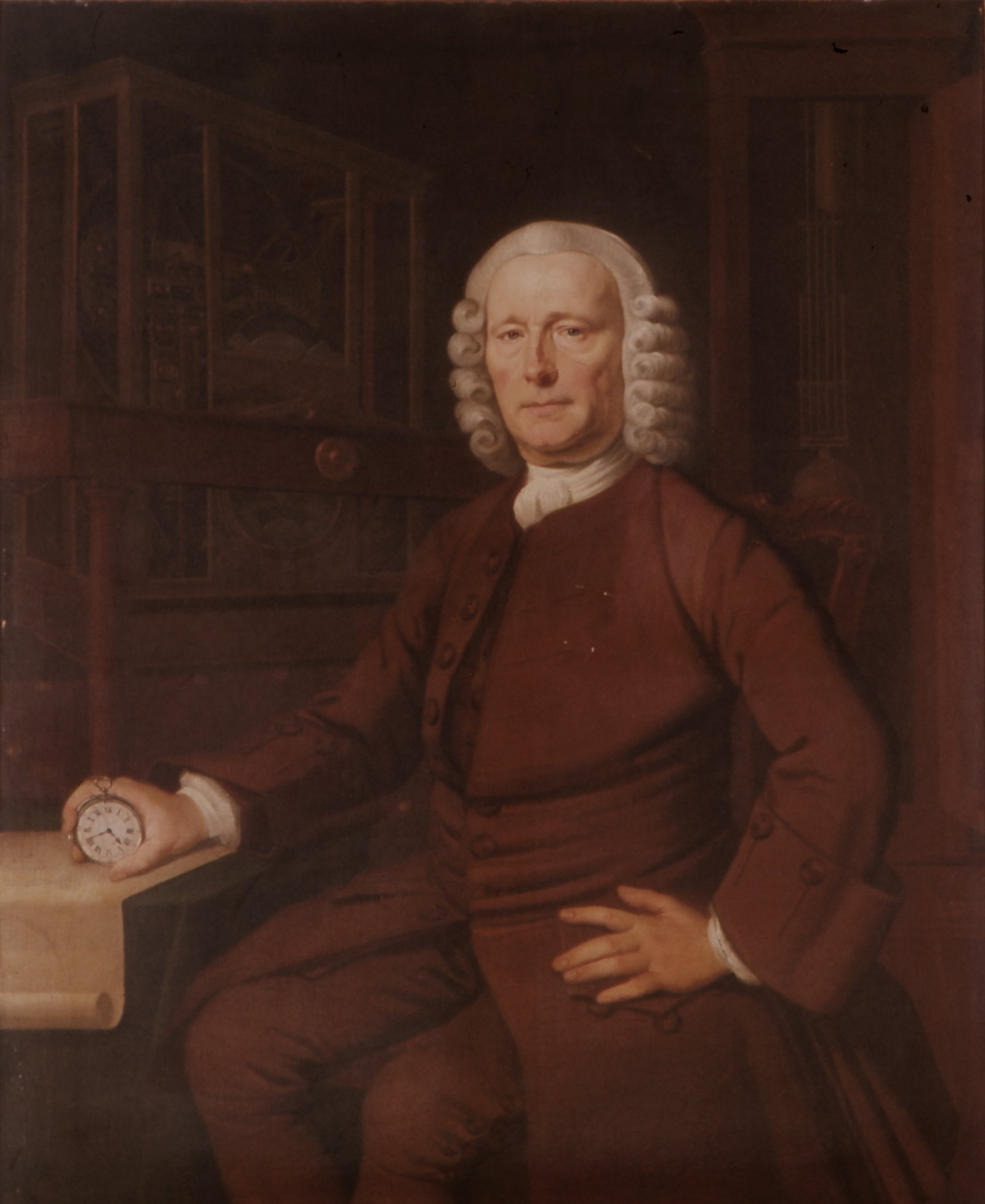
John Harrison

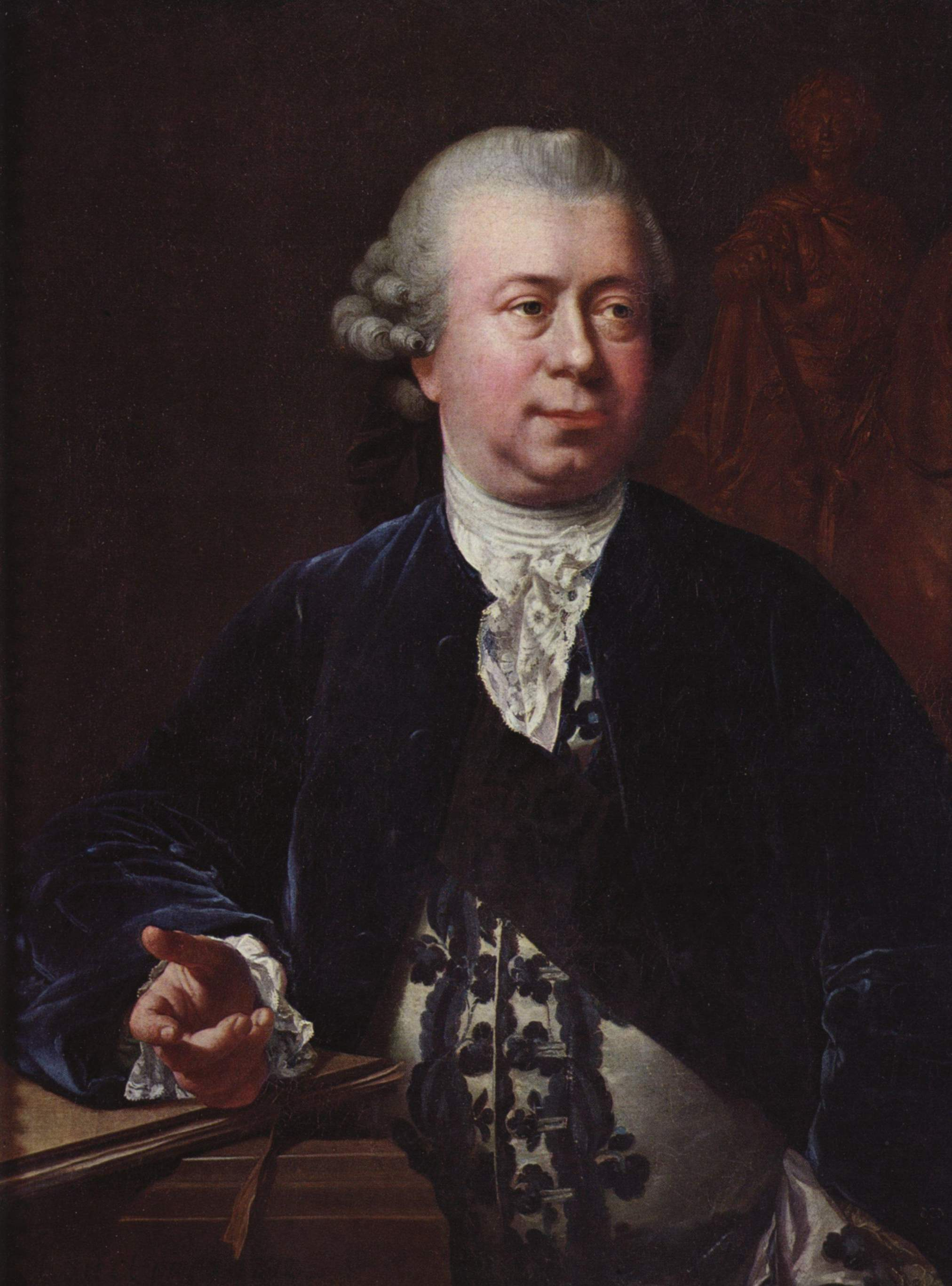
Jacques Saly

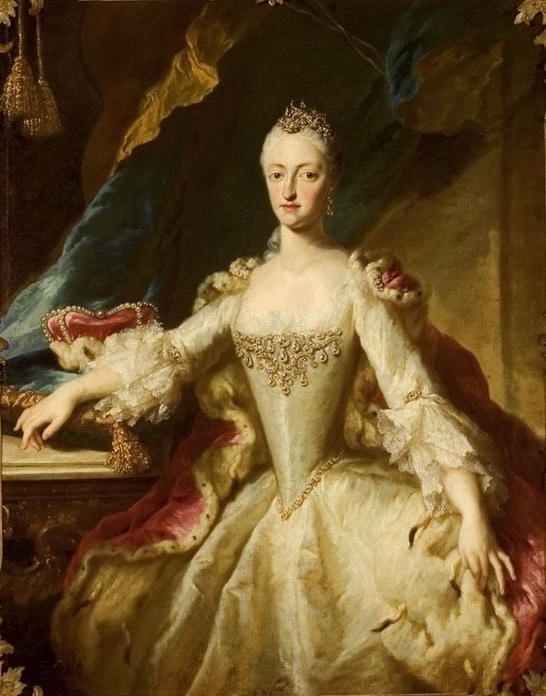
Duchess Maria Anna Josepha of Bavaria

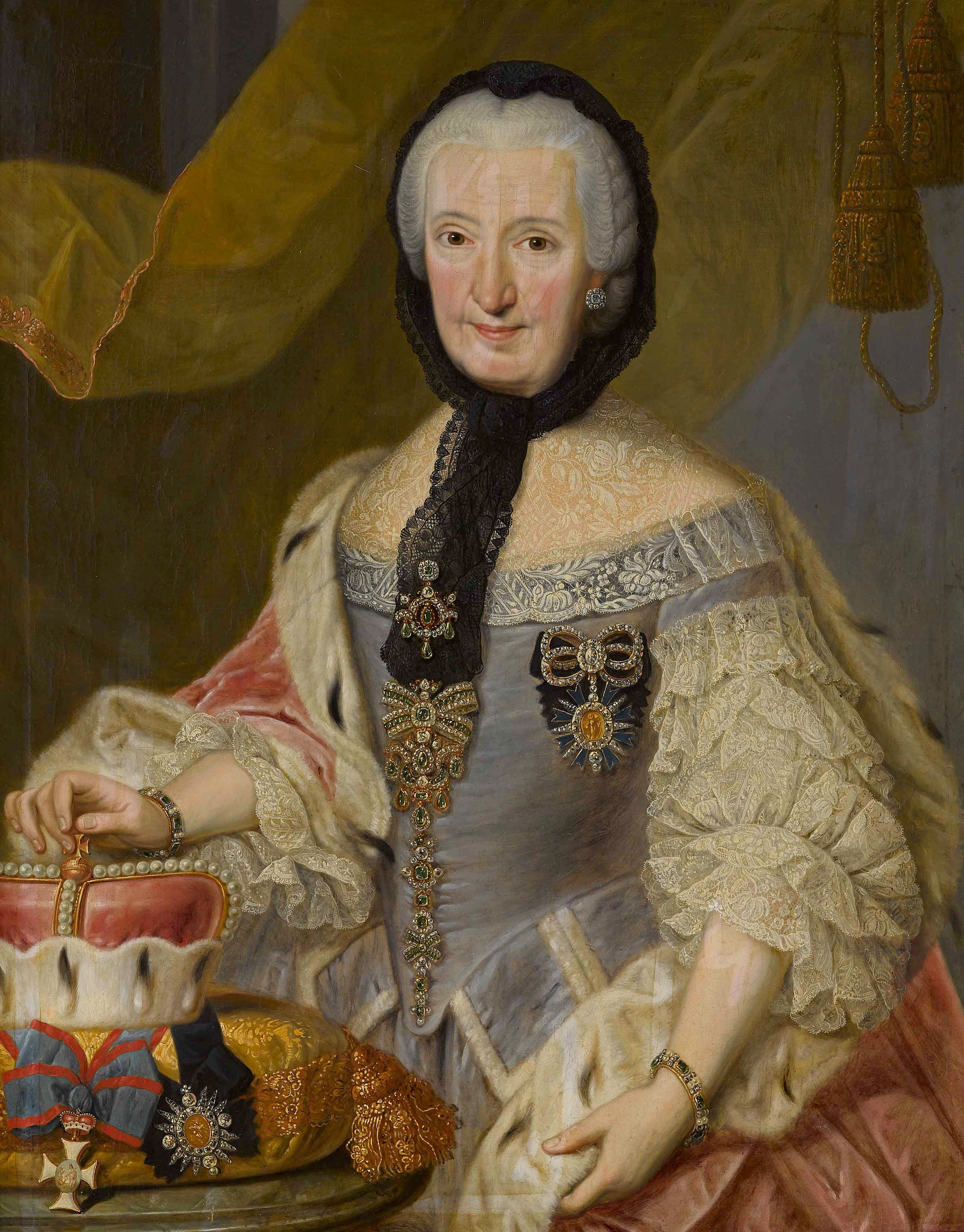
Countess Palatine Francisca Christina of Sulzbach

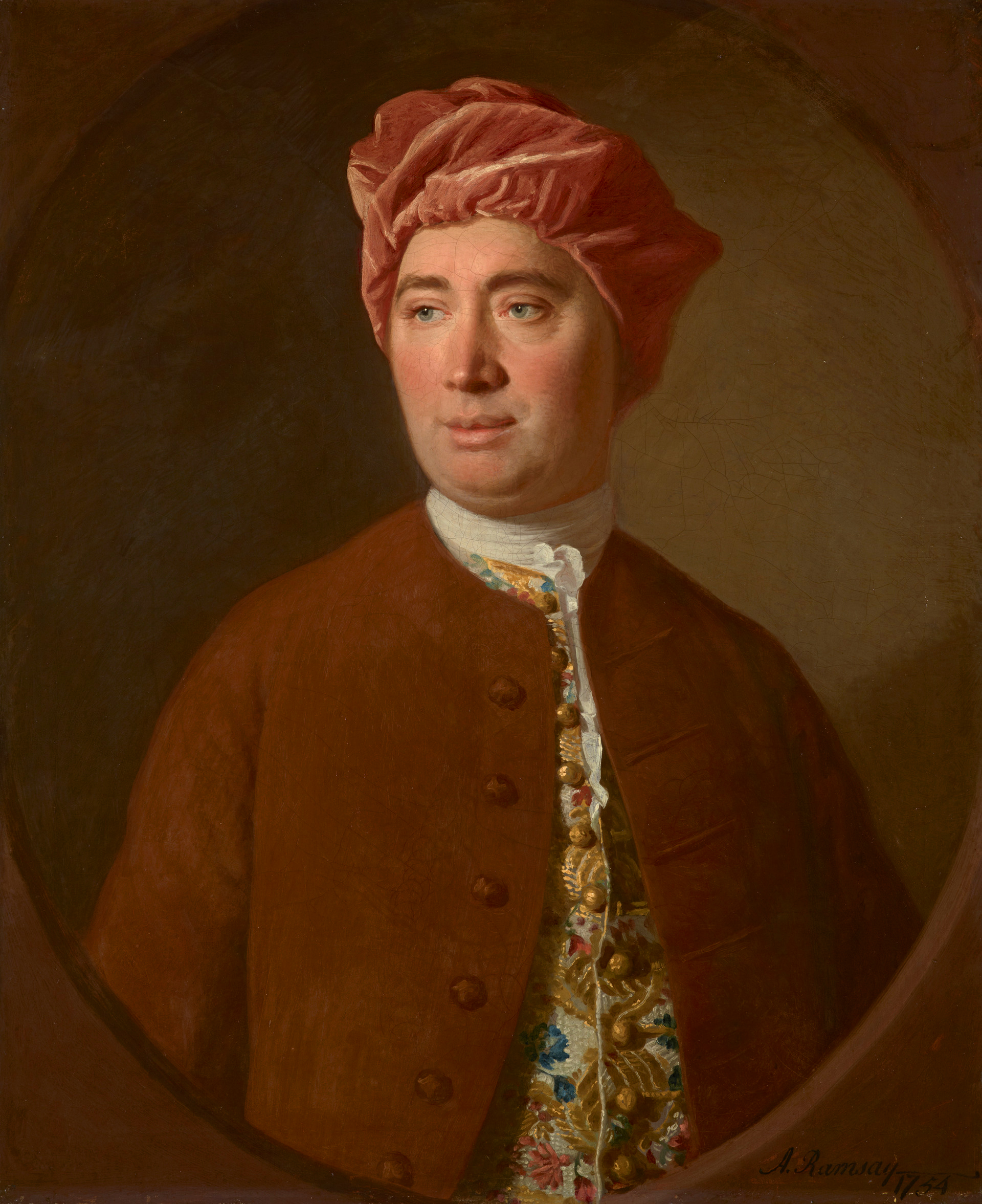
David Hume

- January 6 – James Gabriel Montresor, British military engineer (b. 1704)
- January 8 – James Frye, colonial soldier (b. 1709)
- January 12 – Johann Philipp Murray, German historian interested in early Nordic studies and relations between England and Scandinavia (b. 1726)
- January 14 – Edward Cornwallis, British military officer, first Governor of Nova Scotia (b. 1713)
- January 21 – Jacques de Romas, French physicist (b. 1713)
- February 13 – Élisabeth Catherine Ballard (b. 1704)
- February 18 – Lady Anne Monson, English botanist (b. 1726)
- March 4 – Johann Georg Ziesenis, German – Danish portrait painter (b. 1716)
- March 5 – Pierre-Robert Le Cornier de Cideville, French magistrate and scholar (b. 1693)
- March 7 – John Bowes, 9th Earl of Strathmore and Kinghorne (b. 1737)
- March 10
  - Élie Catherine Fréron, French critic (b. 1719)
  - Niclas Sahlgren, Swedish merchant, philanthropist (b. 1701)
- March 24 – John Harrison, English clockmaker (b. 1693)
- March 26 – Samuel Ward, American politician (b. 1725)
- March 29 – Johann Gotthelf Lindner, German university teacher and writer (b. 1729)
- March 30 – Jonathan Belcher, British-American lawyer (b. 1710)
- March 31 – Jane Randolph Jefferson, wife of Peter Jefferson and the mother of US president Thomas Jefferson (b. 1720)
- April 7 – Charles-Pierre Colardeau, French poet (b. 1732)
- April 19 – Jacob Emden, leading German rabbi and talmudist who championed Orthodox Judaism (b. 1697)
- April 20 – Olivier de Vézin (b. 1707)
- April 29 – Edward Wortley Montagu, English traveller and writer (b. 1713)
- May 4 – Jacques Saly, French sculptor (b. 1717)
- May 6 – James Kent, English organist and composer (b. 1700)
- May 7 – Duchess Maria Anna Josepha of Bavaria, Duchess of Bavaria by birth and Margravine of Baden-Baden by marriage (b. 1734)
- May 23 – Jeanne Julie Éléonore de Lespinasse, French salon holder (b. 1732)
- May 25 – Richard FitzWilliam, 6th Viscount FitzWilliam (b. 1711)
- May 30 – Albert Frick, German theologian (b. 1714)
- June 2 – Continental Army General John Thomas, from smallpox (b. 1724)
- June 10
  - Hsinbyushin (b. 1736)
  - Leopold Widhalm, Austrian luthier (b. 1722)
- June 13 – Elizabeth Scott, British-American poet and Christian hymnwriter (b. 1708)
- June 20 – Benjamin Huntsman, English inventor, manufacturer (b. 1704)
- July 7 – Jeremiah Markland, English classical scholar (b. 1693)
- July 10 – Richard Peters, English-born American clergyman (b. 1704)
- July 15 – Richard Bampfylde, British politician (b. 1722)
- July 16 – Countess Palatine Francisca Christina of Sulzbach, Princess-abbess of Essen Abbey and Thorn Abbey (b. 1696)
- July 21 – Benedicta Margareta von Löwendal, German industrialist (b. 1683)
- August 1
  - Edward Bentham, Oxford based theologian who in 1763 (b. 1707)
  - Francis Salvador, American patriot (b. 1747)
- August 2 – Louis François, Prince of Conti, French military leader (b. 1717)
- August 14 – Charles Cathcart, 9th Lord Cathcart (b. 1721)
- August 25 – David Hume, Scottish philosopher (b. 1711)
- August 27 – William Stark, Revolutionary War era officer (b. 1724)
- August 29 – Joseph Arnold, pre-revolutionary resident of North Kingstown and Exeter (b. 1710)
- September 1 – Angelica Le Gru Perotti, Italian woman painter of the Rococo (b. 1719)
- September 6 – Chamaraja Wodeyar VIII, twentieth maharaja of the Kingdom of Mysore from 1770 to 1776 (b. 1759)
- September 22 – Nathan Hale, American Revolutionary War captain, writer and patriot (executed) (b. 1755)
- September 24 – Charles Cadogan, 2nd Baron Cadogan, Anglo-Irish peer (b. 1685)
- September 28 – Cadwallader Colden, physician (b. 1688)
- October 3 – Ayşe Sultan, Ottoman princess (b. 1713)
- October 10 – Karl Gotthelf von Hund, German Freemason (b. 1722)
- October 15 – John Ellis, naturalist (b. 1710)
- October 17 – Pierre François le Courayer, French theologian (b. 1681)
- October 28 – Princess Sophie of Saxe-Hildburghausen, Princess of Saxe-Hildburghausen by birth (b. 1760)
- October 30 – Simón de Anda y Salazar, Spanish Basque governor of the Philippines from July (b. 1709)
- November 15 – Fernando de Silva, 12th Duke of Alba, Spanish duke (b. 1714)
- November 17 – James Ferguson, Scottish astronomer (b. 1710)
- November 23 – Théophile de Bordeu, French physician (b. 1722)
- December 5 – Elizabeth Percy, Duchess of Northumberland, British duchess; Lady of the Bedchamber (b. 1716)
- December 10 – Robert Hay Drummond, Archbishop of York (b. 1711)
- December 13 – Victor-Thérèse Charpentier (b. 1732)
- December 25 – John Gabriel Jones, colonial American pioneer and politician (b. 1752)
- date unknown – Muhammad al-Warghi, Tunisian writer and poet (b. c. 1713)
