= WADD =

Wadd is the pre-Islamic Arabian god of love and friendship.

Wadd or WADD may also refer to:

== People ==
- Johnny Wadd, a stage name of John Holmes, a pornographic actor and suspect in the 1981 Wonderland murders
- William Wadd (1776-1829), an English surgeon and medical author

== Other uses ==
- Ngurah Rai International Airport, whose International Civil Aviation Organization airport code is WADD
- Wadd: The Life & Times of John C. Holmes, a 1998 documentary film
- Wright Air Development Division (WADD), a forerunner of today's Aeronautical Systems Center, part of the U.S. Air Force
