= Pierre Bellot =

Pierre Bellot may refer to:

- Pierre François Bellot (1776–1836), Swiss jurist and politician
- Pierre Bellot (swimmer) (born 1968), French Paralympic swimmer
