= Joseph Küffner =

German musician and composer

Joseph Küffner (Kueffner) (31 March 1776 in Würzburg – 9 September 1856 in Würzburg) was a German musician and composer who, among other achievements, contributed significantly to the guitar repertory, including chamber music.

== Life ==
He was a violinist with the Würzburg court orchestra, and was later, when Würzburg became part of Bavaria (1802), assigned to take charge of military music. At this point he became bandmaster with a Bavarian Army regiment.

== Music ==
A quintet of Küffner's for clarinet and strings was once attributed to Carl Maria von Weber, and is still recorded in collections of Weber's music. He composed seven symphonies and a large number of works for various chamber music combinations. His output also contains a substantial quantity of music for classical guitar (some of it being available in modern editions).

== Compositions ==
- Symphonies
  - First Symphony op. 75 (pub. Schott, 1818)
  - Second Symphony op. 76 (Schott)
  - Third Symphony op. 83 (pub. André, ca 1820)
  - Fourth Symphony op. 141 (Schott)
  - Fifth Symphony op. 142 (pub. by 1824) (Schott)
  - Sixth Symphony op. 150 (Schott)
  - Seventh Symphony op. 164 (pub. 1826) (Schott)
- Concertante
  - Polonaise for trumpet and orchestra, op. 126
  - Potpourri, Concerto [No. 1] in D for viola and orchestra op. 57 (1816)
  - Concerto [No. 2] in A for viola and orchestra, op. 139 (1823)
- Chamber music
  - Serenade for flute (or violin), violin (or viola) and guitar (or piano) op. 4
  - Serenade für Flöte oder Violine, Viola und Klavier =Serenade for flute or violin, viola and piano : op. 10
  - Serenade for clarinet, viola and guitar op. 21
  - Introduction, theme and variations for clarinet quintet (attributed to Weber as opus 32)
  - Clarinet quintet op. 33
  - Trios for three flutes op. 34
  - Quintet for five winds plus bass op. 40 no. 3
  - Three String Quartets op. 41
  - Sonata for guitar and piano op. 42 in C
  - Serenade for flute (or violin) and guitar in C op. 44
  - Serenade for clarinet, viola and guitar op. 45
  - String Quartet in F major op. 52 (by 1820)
  - Serenade for flute, viola and guitar op. 60
  - Horn Quintet op. 66
  - Duets for clarinet and oboe op. 80
  - 25 Sonatines for guitar op. 80
  - Three Duos for Two Clarinets op. 81
  - Twelve duos for two guitars op. 87
  - Serenade in D for violin (or flute) and guitar, op. 97
  - Three duets for clarinets op. 105
  - Notturno op. 110 for violin, flute, viola and guitar (or lute) op. 110
  - Harmoniemusik op. 138
  - Quintetto, guitare & quatuor à cordes, op. 156
  - Serenade for flute and guitar in C op. 158
  - Etudes for two guitars op. 168
  - Musique Militaire, sinfonie et danses (opp. 169–70)
  - String Quartet op. 178 (1823-4)
  - Introduction, theme and variations op. 190
  - Potpourri on Il Barbiere di Siviglia op. 198
  - 24 Instructive Duets for oboes op. 199
  - 24 Instructive Duets for clarinets op. 200
  - 24 Instructive Duets for bassoons op. 212
  - XXIme Potpourri pour piano et flute ou violon sur des motifs de l'opéra "Guillaume Tell", op. 225 (pub. 1852)
  - Divertissement for horn or viola or cello and piano op. 231
  - 31me Potpourri, pour piano et flûte ou violon op. 257
  - 40me Potpourri pour piano et flûte ou violon: motifs favoris de l'opéra Le postillon de Lonjumeau d'Adolphe Adam op. 275
  - Pastorale pour guitarre
