= Ingelbrecht Knudssøn =

Norwegian civil servant and politician

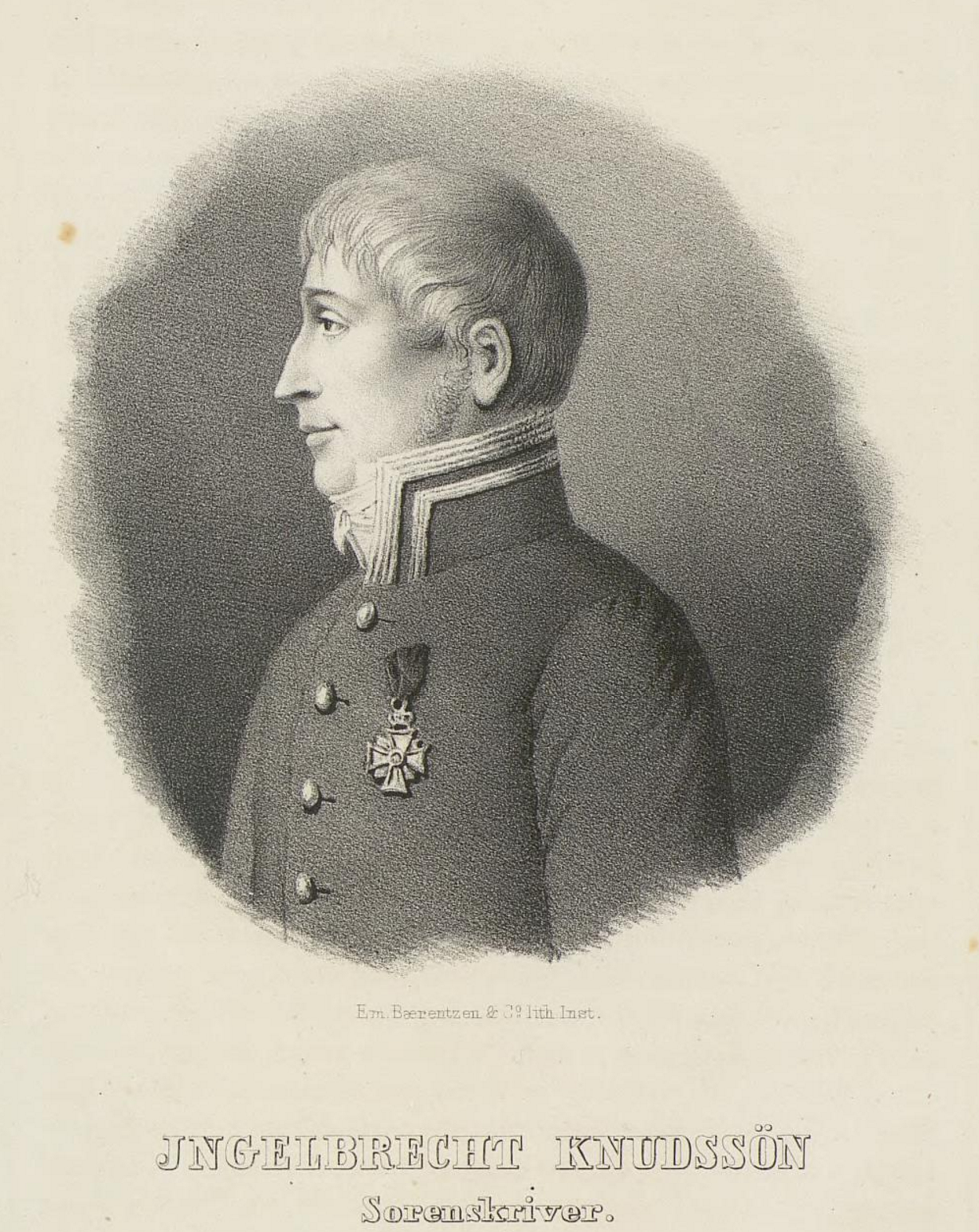
Ingelbrecht Knudssøn.png

Ingelbrecht Knudssøn (14 December 1776 – 21 March 1826) was a Norwegian civil servant and politician.

Knudssøn was born at Byneset in Søndre Trondhjem county. He received his law certification from the University of Copenhagen in 1804. He was a judge in Finnmark from 1810–1815, a magistrate in Romsdal and bailiff in Molde from 1816-1821, and then starting in 1821 he was the judge in the prestegjelds of Strinda and Selbu. Knudssøn was elected in the Norwegian Parliament in 1818 and 1821 as a representative from Kristiansund and Molde; in 1824 he represented Trondheim.
