= Angelica Le Gru Perotti =

Italian artist (1719–1776)

- Born: 1719; Verona, Italy
- Died: 1 September 1776 (aged 56–57); London, United Kingdom
- Known for: Painting
- Movement: Rococo
- Spouse: P. A. Perotti

Angelica Le Gru Perotti (1719 – 1 September 1776) was an Italian painter and pastellist of the Rococo period, active at first in Northern Italy and Venice.

She was born into a family of painters, including her father, the portraitist Stefano Le Gru, and her three brothers, Giuseppe, Tommaso, and Lodovico. Le Gru trained with painter Rosalba Carriera in Venice. She married the painter Pietro Antonio Perotti. In 1768, the Perottis moved to London. Angelica Perotti worked mainly in pastel. She exhibited at least five works at the Royal Academy in 1772 and 1775. She is best known for pastel portraits she completed in London, similar to the voyages of Rosalba Carriera.
