= James Ferguson (Scottish astronomer) =

Scottish astronomer (1710–1776)

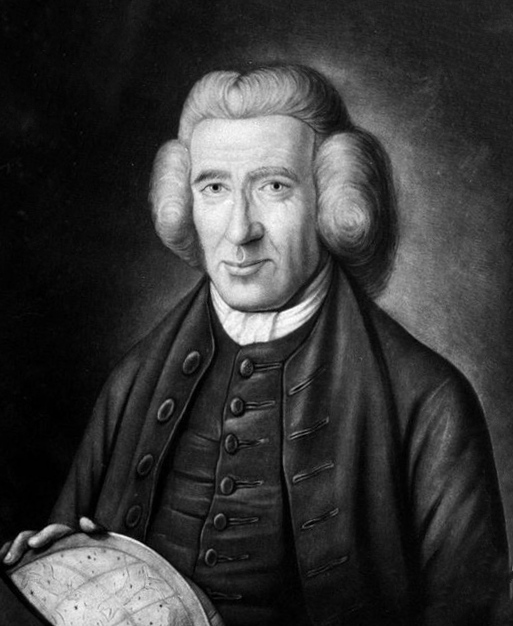
James Ferguson (1710-1776)

James Ferguson (25 April 1710 – 17 November 1776) was a Scottish astronomer. He is known as the inventor and improver of astronomical and other scientific apparatus, as a striking instance of self education and as an itinerant lecturer. He had a nickname "chips"

== Biography ==
Ferguson was born near Rothiemay in Banffshire of humble parents. According to his autobiography, he learned to read by hearing his father teach his elder brother, and with the help of an old woman was able to read quite well before his father thought of teaching him. After his father taught him to write, he was sent at the age of seven for three months to the grammar school at Keith and that was all the formal education he ever received.

His taste for mechanics was about this time accidentally awakened on seeing his father making use of a lever to raise a part of the roof of his house — an exhibition of strength which excited his wonder. In 1720 he was sent to a neighboring farm to keep sheep, where he amused himself by making models of machines, and at night he studied the stars. Afterwards, as a servant with a miller, and then with a doctor, he met with hardships which rendered his constitution feeble through life. Being compelled by his health to return home, he then amused himself with making a clock having wooden wheels and a whalebone spring. When slightly recovered he showed this and some other inventions to a gentleman, who employed him to clean his clocks, and to make his house his home. He there began to draw patterns for needlework, and his success in this art led him to think of becoming a painter.

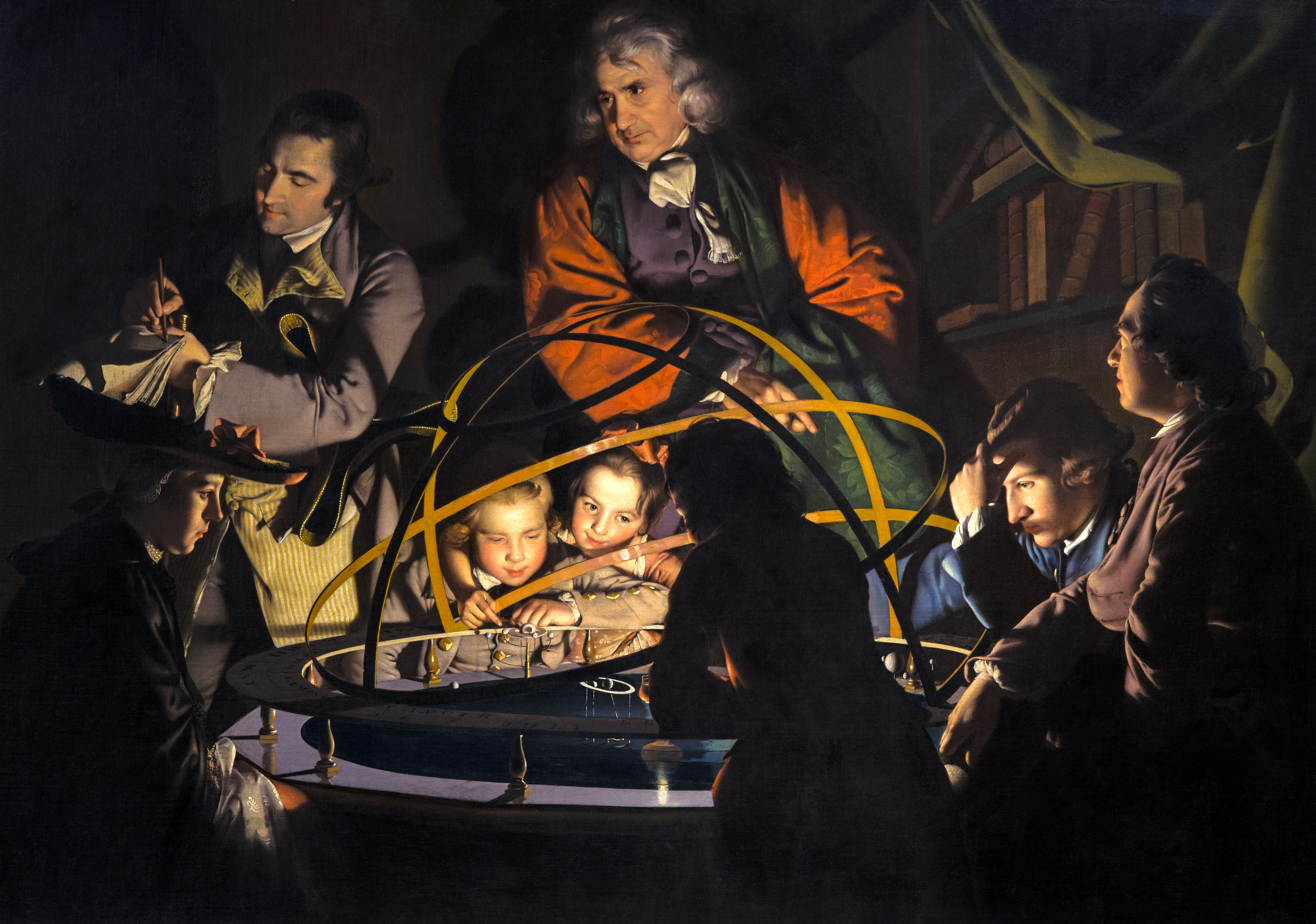
A Philosopher Lecturing on the Orrery by Joseph Wright of Derby. Use a cursor to see who is who.

In 1734 he went to Edinburgh, where he began to make portraits in miniature, by which means, while engaged in his scientific studies, he supported himself and his family for many years. Subsequently, he settled at Inverness, where he drew up his Astronomical Rotula for showing the motions of the planets, places of the sun and moon, &c., and in 1743 went to London, England, which was his home for the rest of his life. He wrote various papers for the Royal Society of London, of which he became a Fellow in November 1763. He devised astronomical and mechanical models, like globes. Ferguson's globes were inspired by the early 18th Century globes of John Senex. Senex sold him the copper plates for his globe gores, but not the copper plates used for Senex's pocket globe gores. Consequently, Ferguson designed his own pocket globe, producing several editions. Ferguson had some Senex gores re-engraved by a certain James Mynde, showing Admiral Anson's voyages of the years 1740–1744.

In 1748, Ferguson began to give public lectures on experimental philosophy, which he repeated in most of the principal towns in England. During his time traveling in England, the well known London bookseller Andrew Millar arranged lectures for him in the spa towns of Royal Tunbridge Wells and Bath. Ferguson's deep interest in his subject, his clear explanations, his ingeniously constructed diagrams, and his mechanical apparatus rendered him one of the most successful of popular lecturers on scientific subjects.

As an inventor and developer of astronomical and other scientific instruments, he was noted for his largely self-directed education and contributions to scientific apparatus in Scotland.

During the latter years of his life he received a pension of £50 from the privy purse. He died in London on 17 November 1776 and was buried in St Marylebone churchyard.

== Legacy ==
Although not as well known nowadays, Ferguson was widely influential in his own time. Thomas Paine mentioned him in his publication "The Age of Reason" and William Herschel studied astronomy from his books. His international reputation was such that he was elected to the American Philosophical Society in 1770. The German experimental physicist Georg Christoph Lichtenberg admired Ferguson: "Everything was done by experiments – he had not even chalk and sponge."

== Works ==
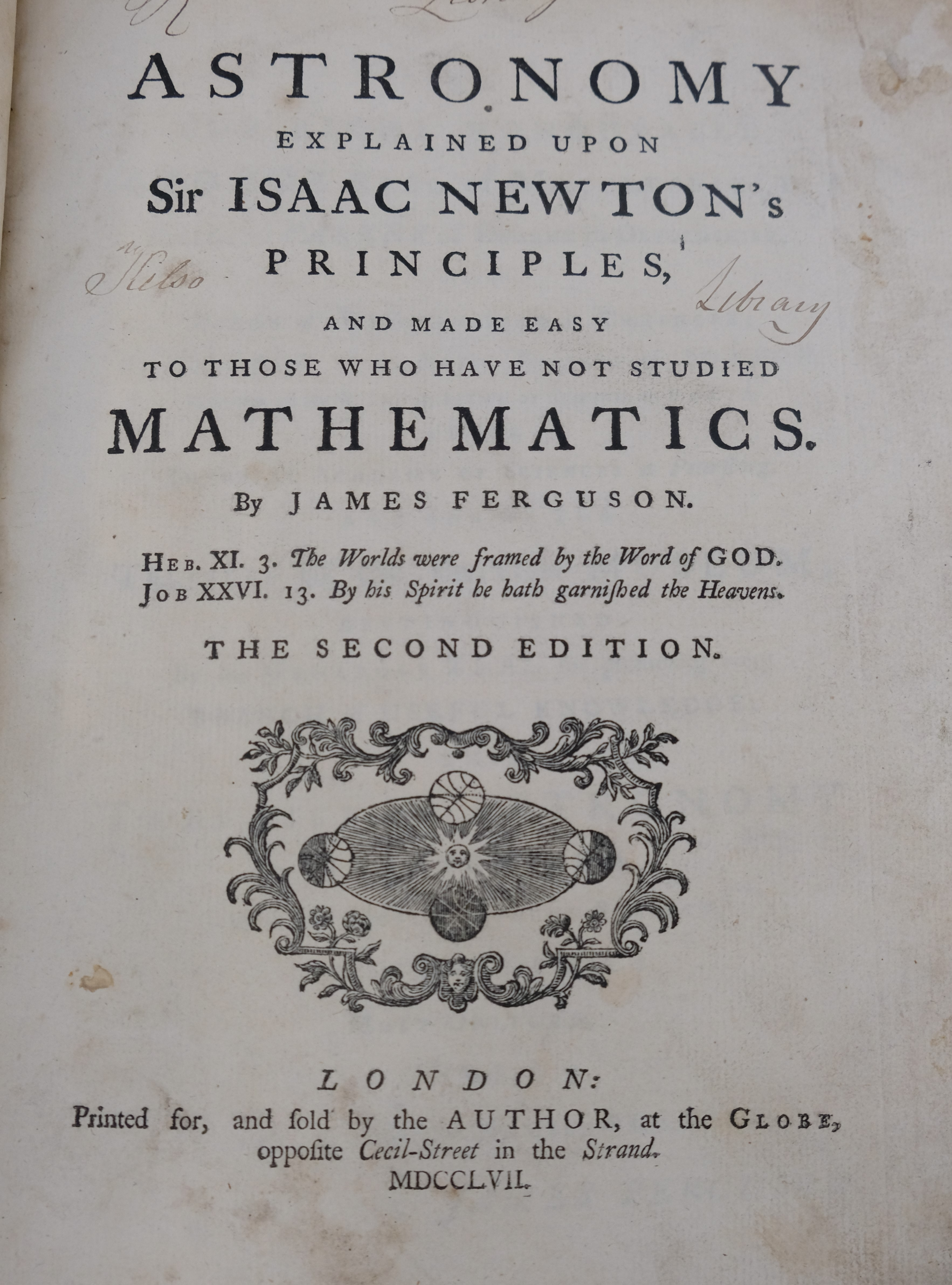
Title page of a 1757 copy of Ferguson's "Astronomy Explained upon Sir Isaac Newton's Principles and Made Easy for Those Who Have Not Studied Mathematics"

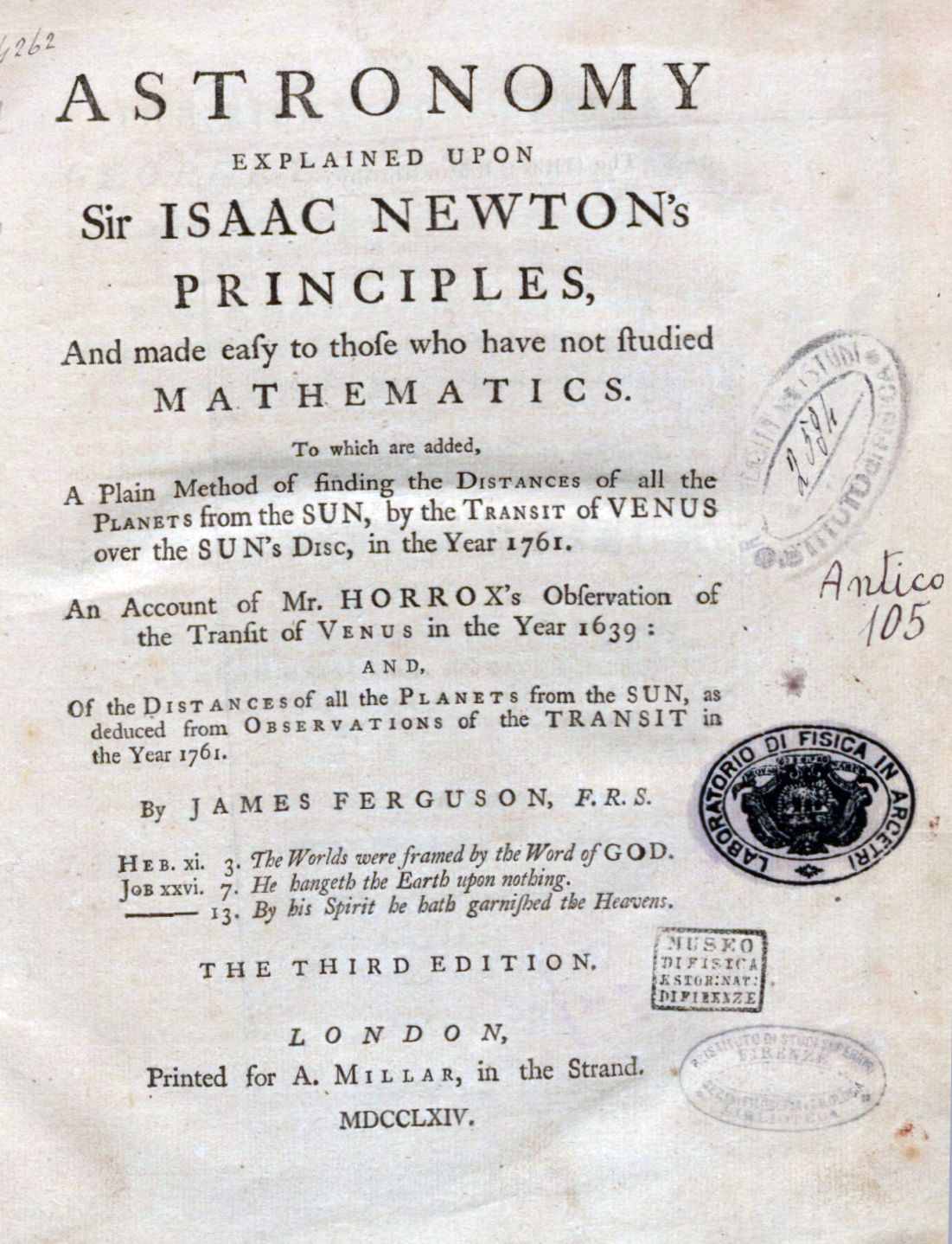
Astronomy explained upon Sir Isaac Newton’s Principles, 1764

Ferguson's principal publications are:

- Astronomical Tables (1763)
- Lectures on Select Subjects (first edition, 1760, edited by Sir David Brewster in 1805)
- Astronomy explained upon Sir Isaac Newton's Principles (1756, edited by Sir David Brewster in 1811)
- Astronomy explained upon Sir Isaac Newton's Principles. London: Andrew Millar. 1764.
- Select Mechanical Exercises, with a Short Account of the Life of the Author, written by himself (1773).
- Introduction to Electricity (First Edition 1770; Second Edition 1775; (1778)).

His autobiography is included in the 1857 biographical dictionary of eminent Scotsmen and in Life by E. Henderson, LL.D. (first edition, 1867; 2nd, 1870), which also contains a full description of Ferguson's principal inventions, accompanied with illustrations.

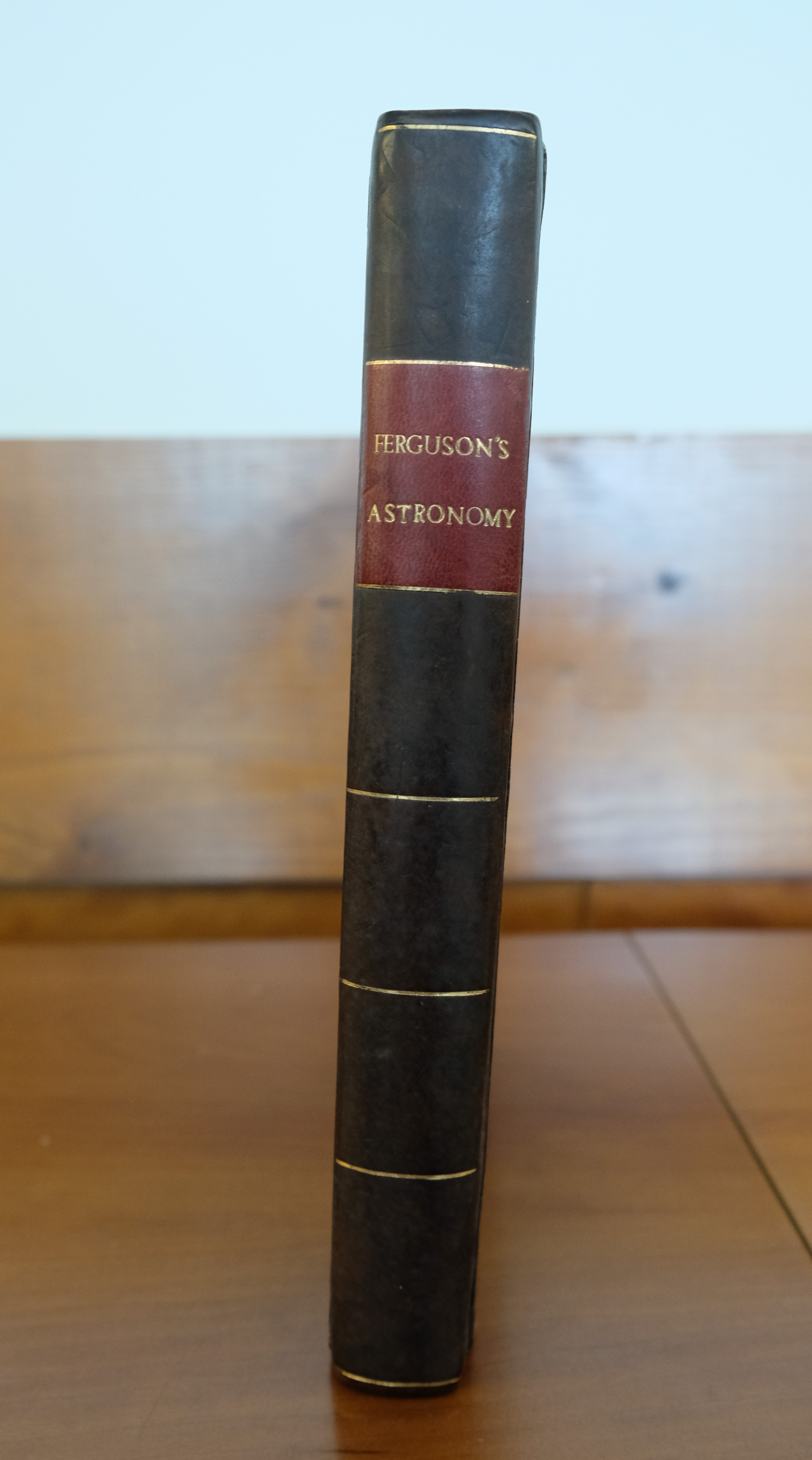
1757 copy of Ferguson's "Astronomy Explained upon Sir Isaac Newton's Principles and Made Easy for Those Who Have Not Studied Mathematics"

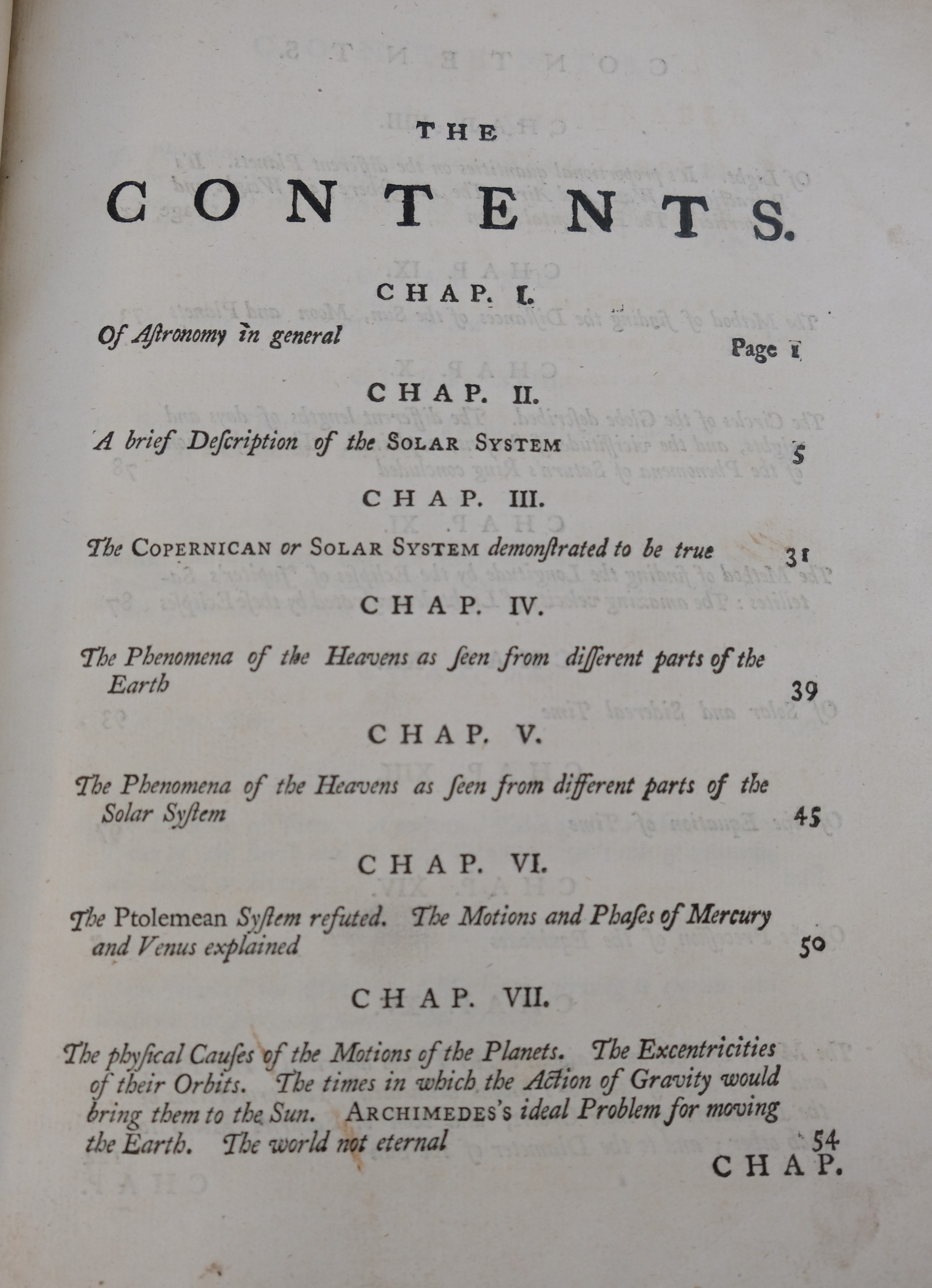
Table of contents for "Astronomy Explained upon Sir Isaac Newton's Principles and Made Easy for Those Who Have Not Studied Mathematics"

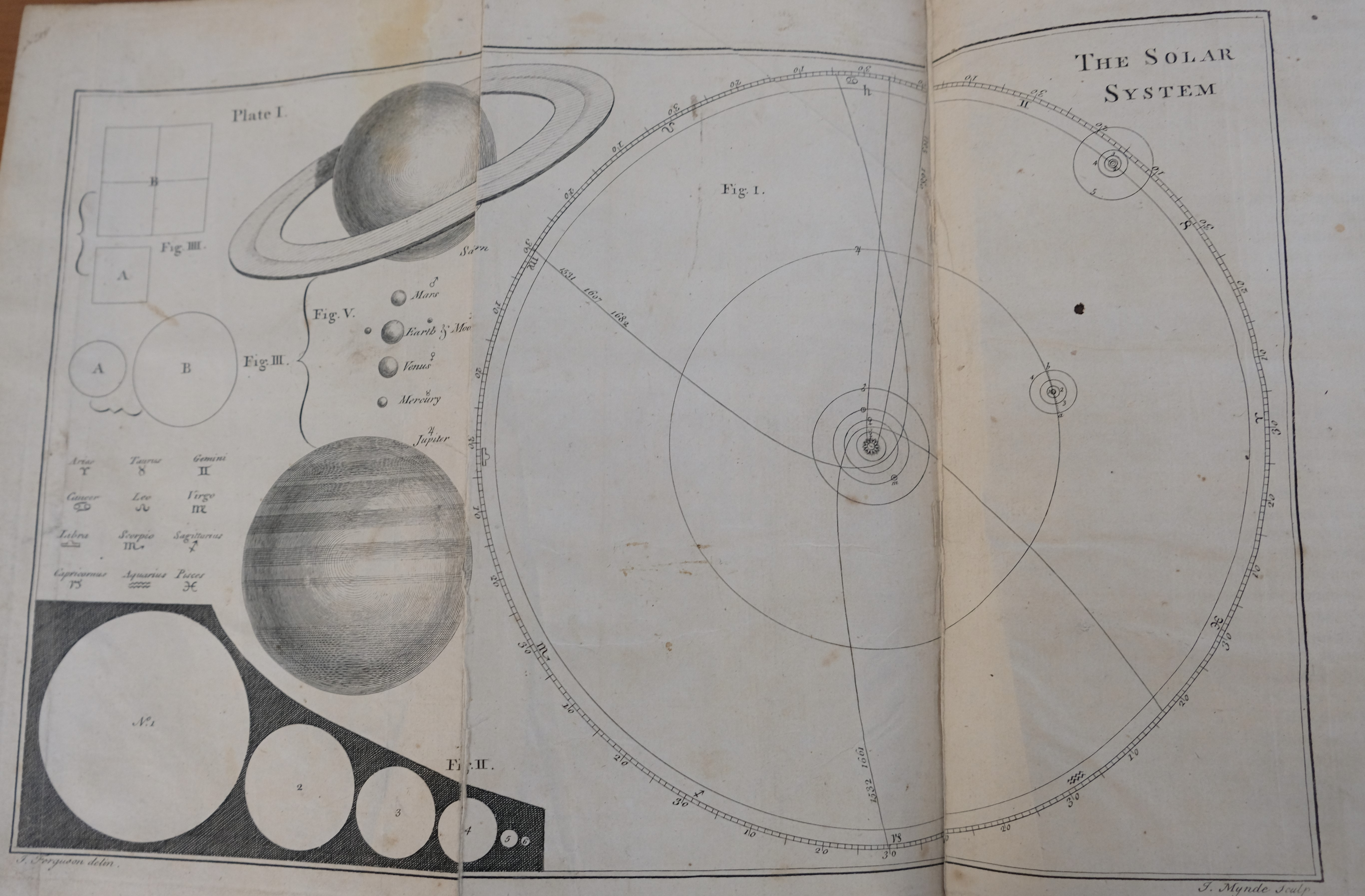
Table from "Astronomy Explained upon Sir Isaac Newton's Principles and Made Easy for Those Who Have Not Studied Mathematics"

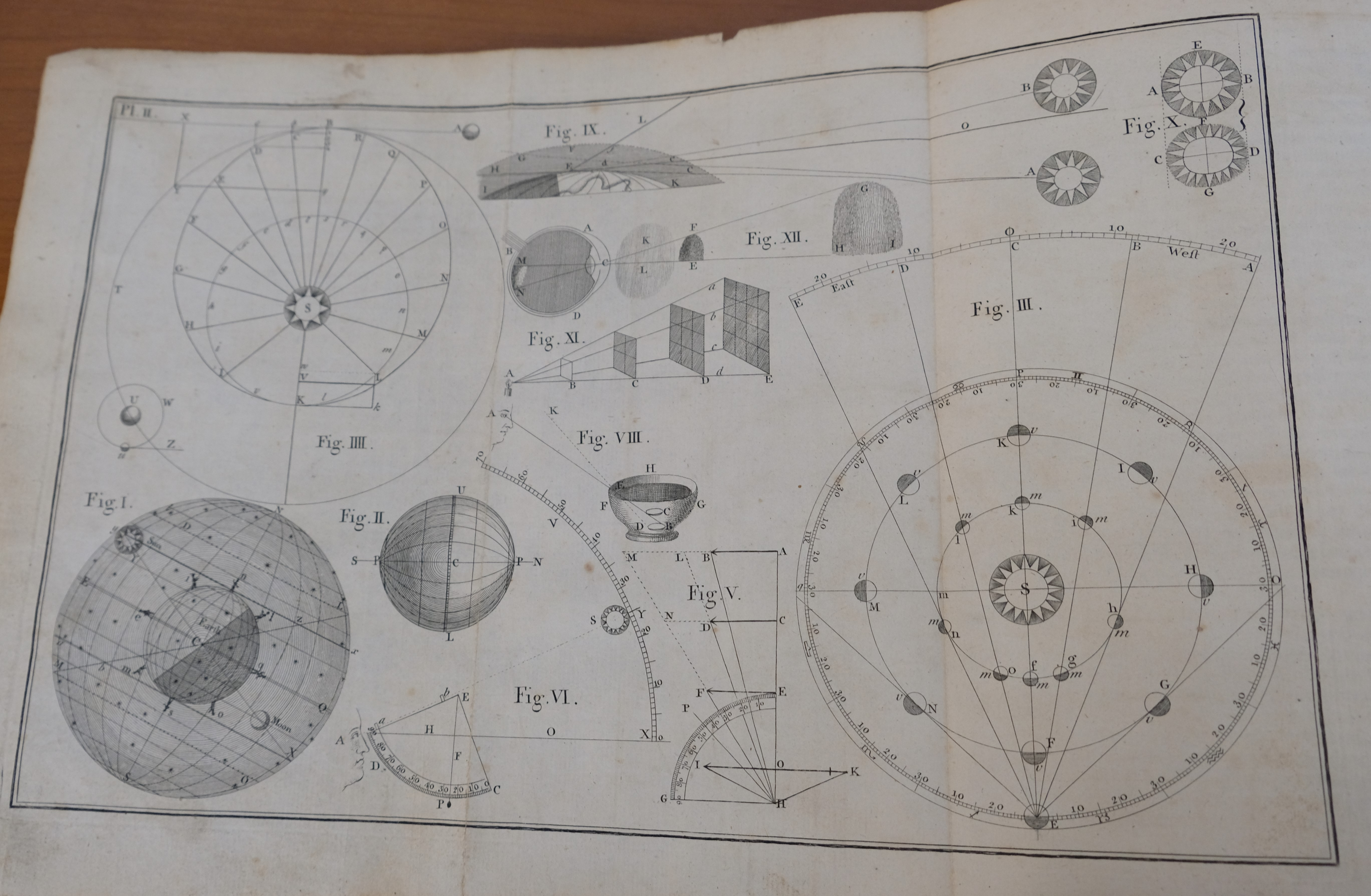
Table from "Astronomy Explained upon Sir Isaac Newton's Principles and Made Easy for Those Who Have Not Studied Mathematics"
