= Albert Frick (theologian) =

German theologian

- Born: 18 September 1714; Ulm
- Died: 30 May 1776 (aged 61)
- Occupation: Theologian; librarian; preacher; teacher
- Parent(s): Johann Frick

Albert Frick (18 September 1714 – 30 May 1776) was a German theologian.

He was born at Ulm on 18 September 1714 and died on 30 May 1776. He studied at Leipsic, and was appointed assessor (judge) to the faculty of theology. In 1743 he became a minister at Jungingen, but, returning to Ulm in 1744, filled the post of librarian and professor of morals. In 1751 he went to Munster as a preacher; and in 1768 was named head librarian. Among his writings are Historia traditionum ex monumentis Ecclesiae Christianae (Ulm, 1740): — De Natura et Constitutione Theologie Catecheticae (Ulm, 1761–64, 4to). — Hoefer, Nouv. Biog. Generale, 18:871.
