= Jens Peter Debes =

Norwegian judge and politician (1776–1832)

Jens Peter Gløersen Debes (23 August 1776 – 1 August 1832) was a Norwegian judge and politician.

He was born in Gamlebyen as a son of Ole Gløersen Debes and Maren Jensdatter Schultz. His father worked as manager of Oslo Hospital. Debes graduated from Christiania Cathedral School in 1792, and with the cand.jur. degree in 1796. He was an assessor in Akershus from 1806 to 1814 and a Supreme Court assessor from 1814 to his death. As such he participated in the Impeachment trials of 1815–1816, 1821–1822 and 1827.

Debes served as a deputy member of the Norwegian Parliament during the first term, from 1815. He met in Parliament from 1816. His work here is known from the diaries of Claus Pavels. Debes wrote diaries himself, as well as topographical books: Samlinger til Agger Sogns og Aggershuus Fæstnings Beskrivelse, Samlinger til Christianias Beskrivelse, Samlinger vedkommende Norges Sprog, Historie og Geographie and Samlinger til Oslos beskrivelse. His book collection was auctioned off after his death. He died in August 1832 in Christiania.
