= William Wadd =

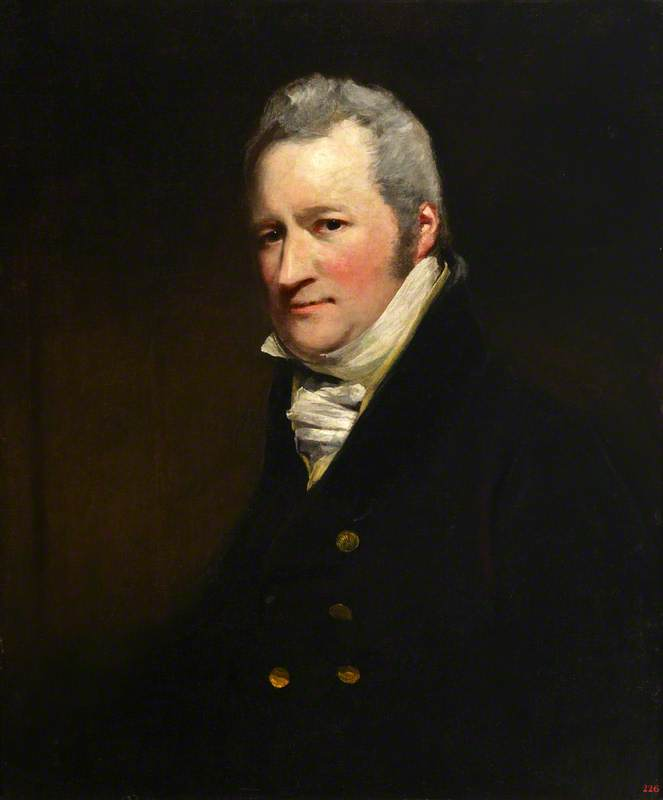
Portrait by John Jackson, 1822

William Wadd (21 June 1776 – 29 August 1829) was a 19th-century British surgeon and medical author.

Wadd, the eldest son of Solomon Wadd (d. 1821), a surgeon, who lived and practised for more than half a century in Basinghall Street, London, was born on 1776, and was entered at Merchant Taylor’s school late in 1784. He was an apprentice to Sir James Earle in 1797, and thus became one of the privileged class of surgeon’s pupils at St Bartholomew's Hospital. He was admitted a member of the Royal College of Surgeons on 18 December 1801, and in 1816 he contested the post of assistant-surgeon to St Bartholomew’s Hospital when John Painter Vincent was elected. He was chosen a member of the College of Surgeons of England in 1824, and was appointed a member of the court of examiners in succession to John Abernethy on 3 August 1829. He was appointed one of the surgeons extraordinary to George IV on 30 March 1821.

He was killed instantaneously on 29 August 1829 in Killarney, County Kerry, by jumping off a runaway carriage on the road from Killarney to Mitchelstown while he was making a holiday tour in the south of Ireland. At the time of his death he was a fellow of the Linnean Society of London, and an associate of the Société de Médecine of Paris.

A man of high talents, Wadd had a rich fund of anecdote. He was an excellent draughtsman, and learnt etching to such good effect that the illustrations in his own works are all the products of his own needle. He married on 5 July 1806, Caroline Mackenzie, who survived him and by her had two children — a son who was drowned at Mauritius in March 1828, and a daughter.

A life-size half-length in oils, painted by John Jackson, was in the secretary’s office at the Royal College of Surgeons in Lincoln’s Inn Fields [c. 1900].

== Works ==
- Practical observations on the nature and cure of Strictures in the Urethra London, 1809, 8vo: 2nd ed. 1811; reissued 1812; 3rd ed. 1826.
- Cursory Remarks on Corpulence London, 1810, 8vo, issued anonymously; 3rd ed. 1816;

reissued in an enlarged form as: Comments on Corpulency, Lineaments of Leanness, Mems on Diet and Dietetics London, 1829, 8vo. The etchings in this volume remind one of George Cruikshank.

- Cases of Diseased Bladder and Testicle London, 1815, 4to, with twenty-one plates; reissued 1817.
- Cases of Diseased Prepuce and Scrotum London, 1817, 4to, with twelve plates.
- On Malformations and Diseases of the Head London, 1819, 4to, with eleven plates.
- Illustrations of Morbid Anatomy London, 1824, fol. with seventy-eight plates.

The original drawings are in the Royal College of Surgeons of England. There is no letterpress attacked to the work beyond the title-page.

- Nugæ Chirurgicæ, or a Biographical Miscellany illustrative of a Collection of Professional Portraits London, 1824, 8vo.

This is the work by which Wadd’s name is best known. The nucleus of the collection of portraits was presented to him about 1814 by Henry Fauntleroy, the banker, who was hanged for forgery. The catalogue is arranged under two alphabets — one of anecdoted biographies, the other of memorabilia. The work is excellent reading, but it is full of inaccuracies both of dates and names.

- Nugæ Canoræ, or Epitaphian Mementoes (in stone-cutters’ verse) of the Medici Family, by Unus Quorum London, 1827, 8vo.
- Mems, Maxims, and Memoirs London, 1827, 8vo.

Both volumes contain a miscellany of things medical, and to the history of medicine and surgery in England. Many have utilised them, but few have acknowledged their indebtedness. They show a wide reading, but are thoroughly uncritical.
