= Pierre François Bellot =

Swiss jurist and politician (1776–1836)

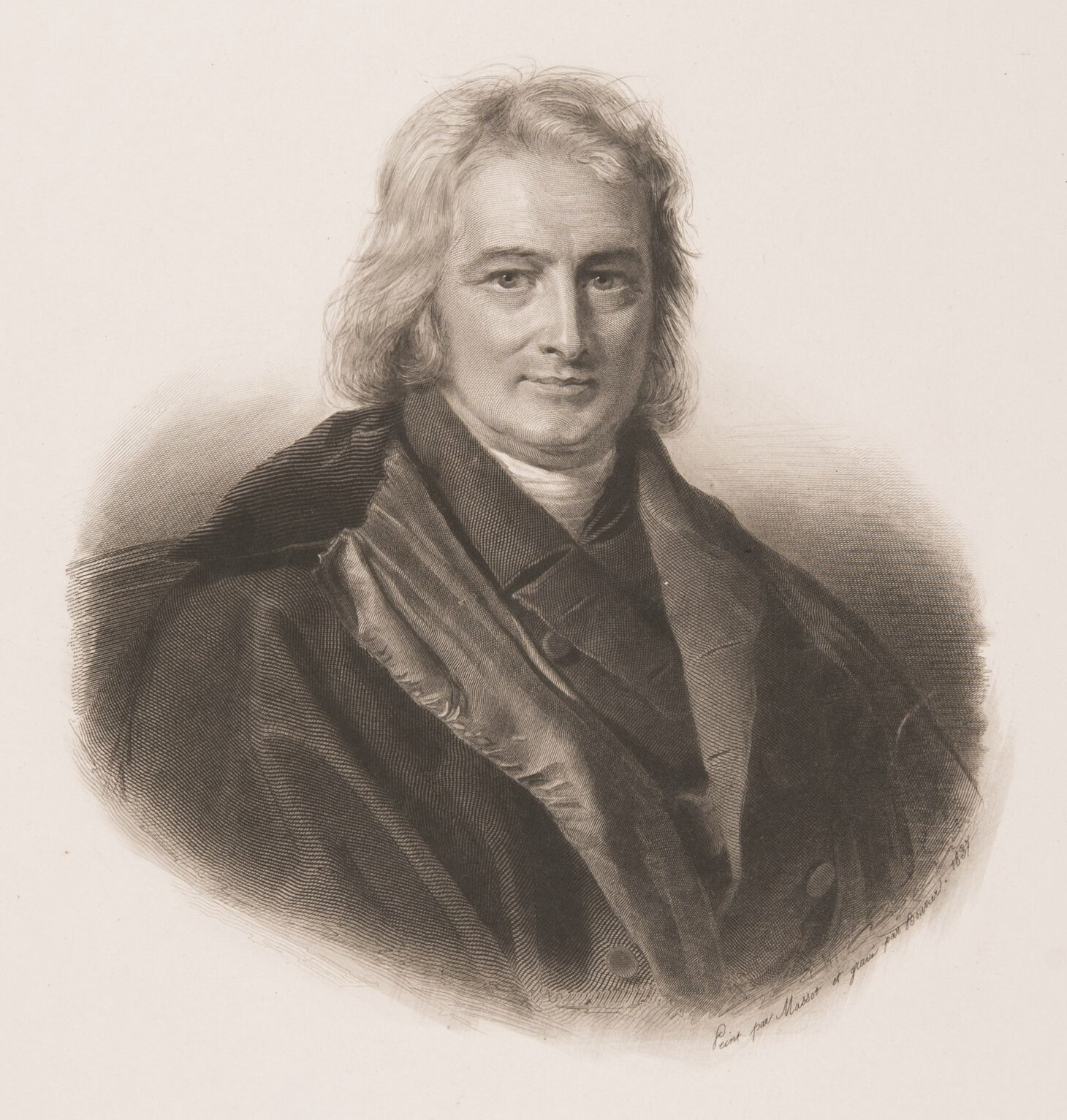
Pierre François Bellot

Pierre François Bellot (April 1, 1776 in Geneva – March 17, 1836 in Geneva) was a Swiss jurist and politician.

Bellot, who never married, studied law in Geneva and was admitted to the bar in 1798. From 1819 to his death he was professor for civil and commercial law as well as civil procedure at the University of Geneva. Under French rule (1798-1813), Bellot held lesser government offices. From 1814 to his death, he was a member of the cantonal parliament, the Representative Council.

Bellot was the principal author of the Geneva Civil Code and was also heavily involved in shaping the cantonal constitution, as well as most other cantonal legislation in the restoration period. Although he published comparatively little, his liberal ideas were instrumental in shaping the legislation of and legal education in Geneva through his voluminous forensic and legislative work.
