= List of cabinets of Curaçao =

The cabinet of Curaçao consists of several ministers and is headed by a prime minister (Dutch: minister president). The incumbent Prime Minister of Curaçao is Gilmar Pisas The Minister Plenipotentiary of Curaçao also is part of the cabinet of Curaçao, but resides in the Netherlands. A Curaçao cabinet becomes "demissionary" upon election day, or upon resignation, and generally stays in office until a new cabinet has been formed. All members of the cabinet are sworn in by the Governor of Curaçao. As of 2021, nine cabinets had served the country, presided over by eight prime ministers.

== Ninth Cabinet ==
The Pisas cabinet is the Curaçao government and comprised a coalition of the parties: Partido Movementu Futuro Kòrsou (MFK) and Partido Nashonal di Pueblo (PNP). The government is headed by incumbent Prime Minister Gilmar Pisas and was sworn in on June 14, 2021, by the Governor of Curaçao, as successor to the Cabinet Rhuggenaath.

| Ministry | Minister | Period | Party |
|---|---|---|---|
| Prime Minister | Gilmar Pisas | 14 June 2021 - | Movement for the Future of Curaçao (MFK) |
| Minister for Education, Science, Culture and Sport | Sithrey van Heydoorn | 14 June 2021 - | Movement for the Future of Curaçao (MFK) |
| Minister for Social Development, Work and Welfare | Ruthmilda Larmonie-Cecilia | 14 June 2022 - | PNP |
| Minister for Justice | Shalten Hato | 14 June 2021 - | Movement for the Future of Curaçao (MFK) |
| Minister for Governance, Planning and Service | Ornelio Kid Martina | 14 June 2021 - | PNP |
| Minister for Finance | Javier Silvania | 14 June 2021 - | Movement for the Future of Curaçao (MFK) |
| Minister for Traffic, Transport and Urban Planning | Charles Cooper | 14 June 2021 – | Movement for the Future of Curaçao (MFK) |
| Minister for Economic Development | Ruisandro Cijntje | 14 June 2021 - | PNP |
| Minister for Health, Environment and Nature | Dorothy Janga | 14 June 2021 - 8 march 2023 | Movement for the Future of Curaçao (MFK) |

== Eight Cabinet ==
The Rhuggenaath cabinet was the Curaçao government and comprised a coalition of the parties: Partido Alternativa Real (PAR), Partido MAN (MAN) and Partido Inovashon Nashonal (PIN). The government was headed by Eugene Rhuggenaath and was sworn in on May 29, 2017, by the Governor of Curaçao, as successor to the Cabinet Pisas. The formation of the Cabinet took one month to conclude.

| Ministry | Minister | Period | Party |
|---|---|---|---|
| Prime Minister | Eugene Rhuggenaath | 29 May 2017 - 14 June 2021 | Real Alternative Party (PAR) |
| Minister of Education, Science, Culture and Sports | Marilyn Alcalá Wallé | 29 May 2017 - 27 January 2020 | Real Alternative Party (PAR) |
| Minister for Social Development, Work and Welfare | Hensley Koeiman | 29 May 2017 - 14 June 2021 | Partido MAN |
| Minister for Justice | Quincy Girigorie | 29 May 2018 - 14 June 2021 | Real Alternative Party (PAR) |
| Minister for Governance, Planning and Service | Armin Konket | 29 May 2017 - 14 June 2021 | Partido MAN |
| Minister for Finance | Kenneth Gijsbertha | 29 May 2017 - 14 June 2021 | Partido MAN |
| Minister for Traffic, Transport and Urban Planning | Zita Jesus-Leito | 29 May 2017 - 14 June 2021 | Real Alternative Party (PAR) |
| Minister for Economic Development | Steven Martina | 29 May 2017 – 21 February 2019 | Partido MAN |
| Minister for Economic Development | Giselle; Mc William | 27 August 2019 | Partido MAN |
| Minister for Health, Environment and Nature | Suzanne Camelia-Römer | 29 May 2017 | Partido Inovashon Nashonal (PIN) |
| Minister Plenipotentiary | Anthony Begina | 29 May 2017 - 14 June 2021 | Real Alternative Party (PAR) |

== Seventh Cabinet ==
On 24 March 2017 Koeiman was succeeded as prime minister by Gilmar Pisas.

| Ministry | Minister | Period | Party |
|---|---|---|---|
| Prime Minister | Gilmar Pisas | 24 March 2017 - 29 May 2017 | Movement for the Future of Curaçao (MFK) |
| Minister for Education, Science, Culture and Sport | Maureena Esprit-Maduro | 24 March 2017 - 29 May 2017 | Independent, representative for Gassan Dannawi |
| Minister for Social Development, Work and Welfare | Jaime Córdoba | 24 March 2017 - 29 May 2017 | Sovereign People |
| Minister for Justice | Gilmar Pisas | 24 March 2017 - 29 May 2017 | Movement for the Future of Curaçao (MFK) |
| Minister for Governance, Planning and Service | Norberto Vieira Ribeiro | 24 March 2017 - 29 May 2017 | Korsou di Nos Tur |
| Minister for Finance | Lourdes Alberto | 24 March 2017 - 29 May 2017 | Independent, representative for Eduard Braam |
| Minister for Traffic, Transport and Urban Planning | Ruthmilda Larmonie-Cecilia | 24 March 2017 – 30 March 2017 | Sovereign People |
| Minister for Economic Development | Errol Goeloe | 24 March 2017 - 29 May 2017 | Korsou di Nos Tur |
| Minister for Health, Environment and Nature | Sisline Girigoria | 24 March 2017 - 29 May 2017 | Movementu Progresivo |

Shortly after the formation of the Pisas cabinet, it requested Governor Lucille George-Wout that the planned 28 April elections be cancelled. Pisas stated that a new majority had been formed in the Estates and that there was thus no need for new elections. This new majority of MP's started a procedure at the European Court of Human Rights (ECHR) to allow the elections to be cancelled. The petition to the ECHR was dismissed by the court on 29 March.

A National Decree was adopted by the Estates on 27 March, calling for the cancelling or postponing of the elections. Governor George-Wout refused to sign the decree, cited it "seriously impaired legal certainty and good governance" and nominated it for destruction at the Council of Ministers of the Kingdom of the Netherlands. The Council of Ministers of the Kingdom of the Netherlands proposed, by use of an Algemene maatregel van rijksbestuur, to task Governor George-Wout with responsibility for holding the elections. Minister of Interior and Kingdom Relations Ronald Plasterk stated that the "interim cabinet severely damaged the integrity of the electoral process" and asked the Council of State for an urgent advice. On 3 April the Council of State gave a positive advice for the proposed measures. The proposed measures were formally taken by the Council of Ministers of the Kingdom of the Netherlands the same day. In response to the actions by the Council of Ministers Pisas stated: "the Netherlands is biased" and that the Netherlands was behind the parties opposing his coalition. He regretted the decision by the council and called it unnecessary.

On 28 April, the day of the elections, Pisas submitted the resignation of his cabinet and that of the Minister Plenipotentiary of Curaçao to the Governor.

== Sixth Cabinet ==
Koeiman's cabinet was sworn in by Governor Lucille George-Wout on 23 December 2016. following the Curaçao general election, 2016. Seven members of the Estates of Curaçao joined the cabinet.

| Ministry | Minister | Period | Party |
|---|---|---|---|
| Prime Minister | Hensley Koeiman | 23 December 2016 – 24 March 2017 | Partido MAN |
| Minister for Education, Science, Culture and Sport | Elsa Rozendal | 23 December 2016 – 24 March 2017 | Partido MAN |
| Minister for Social Development, Work and Welfare | Jaime Córdoba | 23 December 2016 – 24 March 2017 | Sovereign People |
| Minister for Justice | Ornelio Martina | 23 December 2016 – 24 March 2017 | National People's Party |
| Minister for Governance, Planning and Service | Ruthmilda Larmonie-Cecilia | 23 December 2016 – 24 March 2017 | Sovereign People |
| Minister for Finance | Kenneth Gijsbertha | 23 December 2016 – 24 March 2017 | Partido MAN |
| Minister for Traffic, Transport and Urban Planning | Suzanne Camelia-Römer | 23 December 2016 – 24 March 2017 | National People's Party |
| Minister for Economic Development | Eugene Rhuggenaath | 23 December 2016 – 24 March 2017 | Party for the Restructured Antilles |
| Minister for Health, Environment and Nature | Zita Jesus-Leito | 23 December 2016 – 24 March 2017 | Party for the Restructured Antilles |

On 12 February 2017 the Koeiman cabinet fell after Sovereign People withdrew its support in the Estates. The Sovereign People parliamentarians in their letter of withdrawal of support also announced to support a government led by the Movement for the Future of Curaçao of Gerrit Schotte. Koeiman stated that there had been pressure on his government coalition from the start. His cabinet continued as a demissionary cabinet. Koeiman announced he wished to hold new elections on 28 April 2017.

== Fifth cabinet ==
The fourth Cabinet resigned on 9 November 2015 after losing the parliamentary majority when Marilyn Moses withdrew her support. One week later Whiteman announced to have formed a new coalition, with the entry of the Party for the Restructured Antilles (PAR) to the coalition. The PAR held two seats in the Estates and was allowed to deliver the new Minister for Economy. The new cabinet entered in function on 30 November 2015.

| Ministry | Minister | Period | Party |
|---|---|---|---|
| Prime Minister | Ben Whiteman | 30 November 2015 | Sovereign People |
| Minister for Education, Science, Culture and Sport | Irene Dick | 30 November 2015 | Sovereign People |
| Minister for Social Development, Work and Welfare | Ruthmilda Larmonie-Cecilia | 30 November 2015 | Sovereign People |
| Minister for Justice | Nelson Navarro | 30 November 2015 | Partido pa Adelanto I Inovashon Soshal |
| Minister for Governance, Planning and Service | Etienne van der Horst | 30 November 2015 | Partido pa Adelanto I Inovashon Soshal |
| Minister for Finance | José Jardim | 30 November 2015 | Independent, representative for Glenn Sulvaran |
| Minister for Traffic, Transport and Urban Planning | Suzanne Camelia-Römer | 30 November 2015 | National People's Party |
| Minister for Economic Development | Eugene Rhuggenaath | 30 November 2015 | Party for the Restructured Antilles |
| Minister for Health, Environment and Nature | Siegfried Victorina | 30 November 2015 | Sovereign People |
| Minister Plenipotentiary | Marvelyne Wiels | 7 June 2013 | Sovereign People |

== Fourth cabinet ==
A fourth cabinet was sworn in on 7 June 2013, and was characterized as a "political" cabinet, set to complete the full term of parliament. The cabinet was based on a majority in the Estates of Curaçao of the parties Sovereign People (PS), Partido pa Adelanto I Inovashon Soshal (PAIS) and National People's Party (PNP), as well independent member Glenn Sulvaran (formerly PAR) Prime Minister Asjes resigned on 31 August to be succeeded by Minister of Health, Ben Whiteman, on 2 September 2015, pending the search (and screening) of a new prime minister. On 29 October 2015 it was announced Whiteman would stay on until the 2016 elections.

Main office-holders
| Office | Name | Party | Since |
|---|---|---|---|
| Prime Minister | Ivar Asjes; Ben Whiteman | PS | 7 June 2013 – 31 August 2015; 2 September 2015 |
| Minister of Economic Development | Ivan Martina | PAIS | 31 December 2012 |
| Minister of Finance | José Jardim | | 31 December 2012 |
| Minister of Health, Environment, and Nature | Denzil (Ben) Whiteman | PS | 31 December 2012 |
| Minister of Government Policy, Planning and Services | Etienne van der Horst | PAIS | 31 December 2012 |
| Minister of Justice | Nelson Navarro | PAIS | 31 December 2012 |
| Minister of Education, Science, Culture and Sports | Rubina (Rubia) Bitorina; Irene Dick | PS | 31 December 2012-August 2013; 27 December 2013 |
| Minister of Social Development, Labor and Welfare | Jeanne Francisca | PS | 7 June 2013 |
| Minister of Traffic, Transport and urban Planning | Earl Winston Balborda | PNP | 31 December 2012 |
| Minister Plenipotentiary | Marvelyne Wiels | PS | 7 June 2013 |

== Third Cabinet ==
The third cabinet was termed a "task cabinet" and coalition of PAIS, PS, PNP and independent member Glenn Sulvaran. It was planned to be in office for 3 to 6 months and resigned on 27 March 2013 continuing in a demissionary capacity until a new cabinet was formed. Hodge had been director of the Postspaarbank Curaçao. The composition of the cabinet was:

Main office-holders
| Office | Name | Party | Since |
|---|---|---|---|
| Prime Minister | Daniel Hodge | PS | 31 December 2012 |
| Minister of Economic Development | Ivan Martina | PAIS | 31 December 2012 |
| Minister of Finance | José Jardim | | 31 December 2012 |
| Minister of Health, Environment, and Nature | Denzil (Ben) Whiteman | PS | 31 December 2012 |
| Minister of Administration, Planning and Service | Etienne van der Horst | PAIS | 31 December 2012 |
| Minister of Justice | Nelson Navarro | PAIS | 31 December 2012 |
| Minister of Education, Science, Culture and Sports | Rubina Bitorina | PS | 31 December 2012 |
| Minister of Social Development, Labor and Welfare | Sherwin Josepha | PS | 31 December 2012 - June 2013 |
| Minister of Traffic, Transport and Regional Planning | Earl Winston Balborda | PNP | 31 December 2012 |
| Minister Plenipotentiary of Curaçao | Sheldry Osepa; Roderick Pieters | MFK; PS | 10 October 2010; 13 February 2013 |

== Interim Cabinet ==
On 29 September 2012 an interim cabinet was appointed consisting of four ministers. The cabinet continued in a demissionary capacity from the election day of 19 October until a new cabinet took over on 31 December 2012.

Main office-holders
| Office | Name | Party | Since |
|---|---|---|---|
| Prime Minister, General Affairs, Justice | Stanley Betrian | | 29 September 2012 |
| Finance, Economic development | José Jardim | | 29 September 2012 |
| Health, Environment and Nature, Social development, work | Stanley Bodok | | 29 September 2012 |
| Education, Science, Culture and Sports, Planning and service | C. G. Smit | | 29 September 2012 |
| Traffic, Transportation and Planning | Dominique Adriaens | | 17 October 2012 |
| Minister Plenipotentiary of Curaçao | Sheldry Osepa | MFK | 10 October 2010 |

== First cabinet ==
The first Cabinet of Curaçao, installed on 10 October 2010, is as follows: The cabinet lost its majority in the Parliament of Curaçao in 2012, after two members of the parliament left their party. The cabinet stayed as a demissionary cabinet and called elections for 19 October 2012. As a result of a request by the majority of the Parliament of Curaçao, the Governor appointed an interim-cabinet on 29 September 2012. This move was termed a coup by Schotte, who did not accept the decision.

Main office-holders
| Office | Name | Party | Since |
|---|---|---|---|
| Prime Minister | Gerrit Schotte | MFK | 10 October 2010 |
| Minister of Finance | George Jamaloodin | MFK | 10 October 2010 |
| Minister of Justice | Elmer Wilsoe | PS | 10 October 2010 |
| Minister of Economic Affairs | Abdul Nasser El Hakim | MFK | 10 October 2010 |
| Minister of Health, Environment, and Nature | Jacinta Constancia | MFK | 10 October 2010 |
| Minister of Education | Rene Rosalia; Lionel Jansen; Carlos Monk | PS | 10 October 2010 – 1 April 2011; 1 August 2011 – 23 March 2012; 24 March 2012- |
| Minister of Administration and Planning | Norman Girigorie; Lia Willems; Carlos Monk; Carlos Trinidad | PS | 10 October 2010; 21 January 2011; 9 June 2011; 1 June 2012 |
| Minister of Infrastructure | Charles Cooper | MAN | 10 October 2010 |
| Minister of Social Development | Hensley Koeiman | MAN | 10 October 2010 |
| Minister Plenipotentiary of Curaçao | Sheldry Osepa | MFK | 10 October 2010 |
