= 2026 in Curaçao =

- Decades: 2000s; 2010s; 2020s
- See also: Other events of 2026; Timeline of Curaçao history

Events in the year 2026 in Curaçao.

== Incumbents ==
- Monarch – Willem-Alexander
- Governor – Lucille George-Wout
- Prime Minister – Gilmar Pisas

== Events ==
- 21 February – Kimberly de Boer is crowned Reina Hispanoamericana 2026 in Bolivia.

=== Scheduled ===
- 11 June–19 July – Curaçao will participate at the 2026 FIFA World Cup

== Holidays ==
- 1 January – New Year's Day
- 3 March – Carnival
- 18 April – Good Friday
- 20 April – Easter
- 21 April – Easter Monday
- 27 April – King's Day
- 1 May – Labour Day
- 29 May – Ascension Day
- 8 June – Pentecost
- 2 July – Curaçao National Flag and Anthem Day
- 10 October – Curaçao Day
- 25 December – Christmas Day
- 26 December – Boxing Day
