= 2021 in Curaçao =

- Decades: 2000s; 2010s; 2020s
- See also: Other events of 2021; Timeline of Curaçao history

Events in the year 2021 in Curaçao.

== Incumbents ==
- Monarch – Willem-Alexander
- Governor – Lucille George-Wout
- Prime Minister – Gilmar Pisas

== Events ==
Ongoing — COVID-19 pandemic in Curaçao

- 19 March – 2021 Curaçao general election.

== Deaths ==
- 23 January – Lia Willems-Martina, government minister (born 1949).
- 7 March – Almier Godett, 38, politician; shot
