= 2023 in Curaçao =

- Decades: 2000s; 2010s; 2020s
- See also: Other events of 2023; Timeline of Curaçao history

Events in the year 2023 in Curaçao.

== Incumbents ==
- Monarch – Willem-Alexander
- Governor – Lucille George-Wout
- Prime Minister – Gilmar Pisas

== Events ==
Ongoing — COVID-19 pandemic in Curaçao

== Deaths ==
- 14 December – Amerigo Thodé, 73, politician, president of the Parliament (2012, 2017).
