= Eunice Eisden =

Minister Plenipotentiary of Curaçao
- In office 23 December 2016 – 13 April 2017
- Monarch: Willem Alexander
- Prime Minister: Hensley Koeiman; Gilmar Pisas
- Governor: Lucille George-Wout
- Preceded by: Marvelyne Wiels
- Succeeded by: Leendert Rojer

Personal details
- Born: 22 September 1961 (age 64) Curaçao
- Party: Partido MAN

Eunice M.D. Eisden (born 22 September 1961) is a Curaçaoan politician. She was Minister Plenipotentiary of Curaçao between 23 December 2016 and 13 April 2017. She was succeeded by Leendert Rojer.

Eisden is a member of the Partido MAN. In 2009 she served as party leader in the Estates of the Netherlands Antilles. She was leader of the Partido MAN list for the 2010 Curaçao general election. Eisden obtained a seat in the Estates of Curaçao (2010–2012).

On 29 May 2017 she was appointed as Deputy Minister Plenipotentiary of Curaçao in the cabinet of Eugene Rhuggenaath.
