= Carlson Manuel =

Curaçaoan politician

Minister Plenipotentiary of Curaçao
- Incumbent
- Assumed office June 2021
- Preceded by: Anthony Begina

Personal details
- Party: Movement for the Future of Curaçao
- Education: Rotterdam University of Applied Sciences

Carlson "Carls" Manuel is a Curaçaoan politician who has been Minister Plenipotentiary of Curaçao since June 2021.

== Early life ==
Manuel was born as son of radio reporter Cali Manuel. He obtained a diploma in management information systems. Manuel studied at Rotterdam University of Applied Sciences and obtained a bachelor's degree in information technology. He also studied at Codarts. He subsequently worked as a singing and music teacher.

== Political career ==
In the 2021 Curaçao general election he was number fifteen on the list of Movement for the Future of Curaçao. With the formation of a new government he was made Minister Plenipotentiary of Curaçao in June 2021 and succeeded Anthony Begina.

In July 2021 he stated that the Curaçaohuis, the office of the Minister Plenipotentiary of Curaçao, needed to become more efficient and more visible to the Curaçaoan community in the Netherlands. In October 2021, after Knipselkrant Curaçao published an article stating that Manuel hired his brother and sister-in-law at the Curaçaohuis, Manuel responded by saying that his brother was paid out of his own pocket and his sister-in-law only provided voluntary service free of charge. Manuel stated that the allegations were made by a journalist whom he had refused to hire. A report by the Ministry of Governance, Planning and Service from November 2021 was highly critical of the hiring of four people at the Curaçaohuis. The four people included Manuel's brother, a family friend who was hired as interim-director and two others. Of all individuals was stated that they lacked the necessary qualifications and that work could be performed better by the regular staff of the Curaçaohuis. Although only the position of interim-director was deemed critical, and thus permissible unlike the others of which there was a vacancy stop, the Curaçaoan Council of Ministers gave approval to the hiring of the four. Manuel stated that there were untruths in the covering by the media and that he would start an investigation. In the subsequent months the Curaçaohuis was without a formal competent authority for two months, with the position of director not being filled in. Manuel was subsequently authorized to be the competent authority. In response the Real Alternative Party proposed that the financial administration of the institution should be looked into by the Court of Audit. In July 2022 Sheldry Osepa, member of the coalition National People's Party in the Parliament of Curaçao, was critical of the working conditions in the Curaçaohuis under Manuel and asked 47 questions to Prime Minister Gilmar Pisas on the issue.
