= 2024 in Curaçao =

- Decades: 2000s; 2010s; 2020s
- See also: Other events of 2024; Timeline of Curaçao history

Events in the year 2024 in Curaçao.

== Incumbents ==
- Monarch – Willem-Alexander
- Governor – Lucille George-Wout
- Prime Minister – Gilmar Pisas

== Holidays ==
- 1 January – New Year's Day
- 12 February – Carnival
- 29 March – Good Friday
- 31 March – Easter
- 1 April - Easter Monday
- 27 April - King's Day
- 1 May – Labour Day
- 9 May - Ascension Day
- 24 May - Pentecost
- 2 July – Curaçao National Flag and Anthem Day
- 10 October – Curaçao Day
- 25 December – Christmas Day
- 26 December – Boxing Day
