= Ben Whiteman =

Ben Whiteman may refer to:

- Ben Whiteman (footballer) (born 1996), English professional footballer
- Ben Whiteman (politician) (born 1954), Curaçaoan politician
