= Etienne van der Horst =

Curaçaoan politician (born 1958)

Minister of Government Policy, Planning and Service
- In office 31 December 2012 – 23 December 2016
- Prime Minister: Daniel Hodge; Ivar Asjes; Ben Whiteman
- Succeeded by: Ruthmilda Larmonie-Cecilia

Personal details
- Born: 28 August 1958 (age 68)
- Party: Partido pa Adelanto I Inovashon Soshal
- Education: Delft University of Technology

Etienne van der Horst (born 28 August 1958) is a Curaçaoan politician. A member of the Partido pa Adelanto I Inovashon Soshal, he was Minister of Government Policy, Planning and Service from 31 December 2012 to 23 December 2016.

== Career ==
Van der Horst was born on 28 August 1958. He studied urban design at Delft University of Technology between 1977 and 1984.

Van der Horst started working for the Service for Urban Development and Housing of Curaçao (DROV) in 1985, and kept working there in different functions until 2002. He was head of the organisation from 1991. Between June 2003 and the start of his term as Minister, Van der Horst worked for the Curacao Airport Partners N.V, first as deputy general manager and from 2009 as Chief Corporate Services Officer and as Deputy Chief Executive Officer.

Van der Horst has served as Minister of Government Policy, Planning and Service since 31 December 2012 and has been part of the cabinets of Daniel Hodge and Ivar Asjes. He has held the same post in both Whiteman cabinets.

In October 2015 members of the Estates of Curaçao opposed Van der Horst's plans to not increase salaries of civil servants in 2016.

Van der Horst was replaced by Ruthmilda Larmonie-Cecilia in the Hensley Koeiman cabinet which was installed on 23 December 2016.
