= Ben Whiteman (politician) =

Curaçaoan politician

His Excellency Ben Whiteman
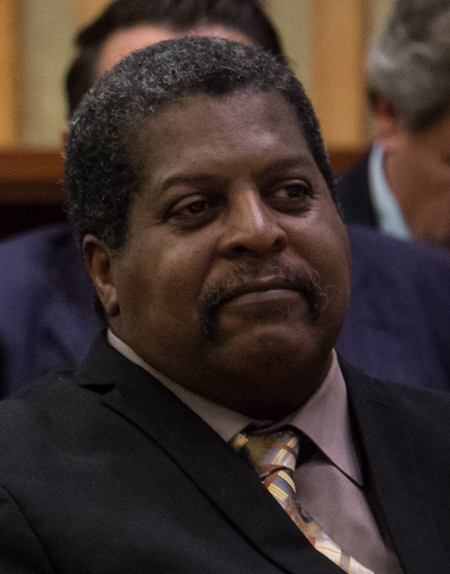

5th Prime Minister of Curaçao
- In office 1 September 2015 – 23 December 2016
- Monarch: Willem-Alexander
- Governor: Lucille George-Wout
- Preceded by: Ivar Asjes
- Succeeded by: Hensley Koeiman

Minister of Public Health, Environment and Nature
- In office 31 December 2012 – 23 December 2016
- Prime Minister: Daniel Hodge, Ivar Asjes, himself
- Preceded by: Stanley Bodok
- Succeeded by: Zita Jesus-Leito

Leader of Sovereign People (pro tempore)
- In office 31 August 2015 – 14 December 2015
- Preceded by: Ivar Asjes
- Succeeded by: Jaime Córdoba

Personal details
- Born: Bernard Denzil Whiteman; 20 August 1954 (age 71)
- Party: Sovereign People (Pueblo Soberano)

Bernard "Ben" Denzil Whiteman (born 20 August 1954) is a Curaçaoan politician who served as the fifth prime minister of Curaçao from September 2015 to December 2016. He also was the Minister of Public Health, Environment and Nature since 31 December 2012 in the Asjes-Cabinet and the Hodge-Cabinet before taking the post, retaining the position after becoming prime minister.

== Early life ==
Bernard Denzil Whiteman was born on 20 August 1954.

== Political career ==
=== Early political career ===
On 31 December 2012 Whiteman became Minister of Public Health, Environment and Nature in the cabinet of Daniel Hodge. In April 2013, as Minister of the Environment, he stated he wished for Curaçao to join the Dutch Caribbean Exclusive Economic Zone. He retained his position in the cabinet of Ivar Asjes.

In February 2016, Whiteman stated that in 2014 he was nearly assassinated while sitting on his balcony.

=== First Whiteman cabinet ===
Whiteman was sworn in as prime minister on 1 September 2015. He succeeded Ivar Asjes, who resigned after he lost the confidence of his party. Whiteman took on the post of prime minister with the intent of staying in office for three months, to allow his party to search for a successor. Whiteman retained the ministerial position he held in the Hodge and Ajses cabinets after becoming prime minister. On 29 October 2015, it was announced Whiteman would stay on until the 2016 elections. The Whiteman Cabinet resigned on 9 November 2015 after losing the parliamentary majority when Marilyn Moses withdrew her support. One week later, Whiteman announced he had formed a new coalition, with the entry of the Party for the Restructured Antilles (PAR) into the coalition. The PAR held two seats in the Estates and was allowed to designate the new Minister for the Economy. The new cabinet began to function on 30 November 2015.

=== Second Whiteman cabinet ===
Ministry	Minister	Period	Party
Prime Minister	Ben Whiteman	30 November 2015 – 23 December 2016	Sovereign People
Minister for Education, Science, Culture and Sport	Irene Dick	30 November 2015 – 23 December 2016	Sovereign People
Minister for Social Development, Work and Welfare	Ruthmilda Larmonie-Cecilia	30 November 2015 – 23 December 2016	Sovereign People
Minister for Justice	Nelson Navarro	30 November 2015 – 23 December 2016	Partido pa Adelanto I Inovashon Soshal
Minister for Governance, Planning and Service	Etienne van der Horst	30 November 2015 – 23 December 2016	Partido pa Adelanto I Inovashon Soshal
Minister for Finance	José Jardim	30 November 2015 – 23 December 2016	Independent, representative for Glenn Sulvaran
Minister for Traffic, Transport and Urban Planning	Suzanne Camelia-Römer	30 November 2015 – 23 December 2016	National People's Party
Minister for Economic Development	Eugene Rhuggenaath	30 November 2015 – 23 December 2016	Party for the Restructured Antilles
Minister for Health, Environment and Nature	Siegfried Victorina	30 November 2015 – 23 December 2016	Sovereign People

A fourth report on the functioning of the Curaçaohuis, the office of the Minister Plenipotentiary of Curaçao, Marvelyne Wiels, was highly critical. The report, and the fact that it had yet not been shared with the Estates of Curaçao, led coalition parties in the Second Whiteman cabinet to voice severe criticism in July 2016. Alex Rosaria, leader of the Partido pa Adelanto I Inovashon Soshal, called the issue "a dark cloud over the Whiteman cabinet". The leader of the PAR, Zita Jesus-Leito, asked for the voluntary resignation or Wiels or else her dismissal by Whiteman.

In November 2016 he faced criticism after several Ministers signed financial agreements although they were not allowed to do so, public servants who voiced criticism were transferred or faced displinary action.

Whiteman's successor as prime minister, Hensley Koeiman, was sworn in on 23 December 2016.

=== Post Prime Minister ===
In October 2018, Whiteman succeeded Jaime Córdoba as leader of Sovereign People. As of August 2023 he remained leader of the party although it was no longer represented in the Parliament of Curaçao. After being hospitalized in May 2025, Whiteman laid down his positions as leader and acting chairman of Sovereign People on 3 June due to health reasons.

Political offices
Preceded by Ivar Asjes	Prime Minister of Curaçao; 2015–2016	Succeeded by Hensley Koeiman
