= Rojer =

Rojer (Dutch pronunciation: [ˈroːi.ɛr]) is a Dutch surname. Notable people with the surname include:

- Eldridge Rojer (born 1984), a Dutch football player
- Jean-Julien Rojer (born 1981), a Dutch tennis player
- Leendert Rojer (born ?), a Curaçaoan politician
