= Marvelyne Wiels =

Minister Plenipotentiary of Curaçao
- In office 7 June 2013 – 23 December 2016
- Monarch: Willem Alexander
- Prime Minister: Ivar Asjes; Ben Whiteman
- Governor: Adèle van der Pluijm-Vrede (acting); Lucille George-Wout
- Deputy: Anthony Begina; Robert Candelaria
- Preceded by: Roy Pieters
- Succeeded by: Eunice Eisden

Personal details
- Born: 15 May 1963 (age 63) Curaçao
- Party: Sovereign People

Marvelyne Fatima Wiels (born 15 May 1963) was the Minister Plenipotentiary of Curaçao between 2013 and 2016. In that capacity she was stationed in The Hague and was a member of the Council of Ministers of the Kingdom.

== Personal life ==
Wiels was born on 15 May 1963 and is the sister of the murdered politician Helmin Wiels. She is a single mother of two children.

== Minister Plenipotentiary ==
Wiels has received criticism for errors in her CV, amongst others relating to a MSc title, as well as the nature of her work at ABN AMRO. Also her management of the Curaçaohuis and the representation of Curaçao in the Netherlands, which falls under her responsibility, were criticized. Criticism in the latter case was related to nepotism and harassment of her deputy. A report of the Ombudsman of Curaçao regarding the criticism resulted in a motion of the parliament of Curaçao "to immediately replace her" did not gain a majority.

During the formation of the second cabinet of Prime Minister Ben Whiteman in November 2015 the Party for the Restructured Antilles (PAR) was willing to join the coalition if Wiels would resign. Wiels' party Sovereign People declined this request. The PAR was then offered the post of deputy Minister Plenipotentiary and it joined the new governing coalition.

A fourth report on the functioning of the Curaçaohuis under Wiels was highly critical. The report, and the fact that it had not been shared yet with the Estates of Curaçao, led to coalition parties in the Second Whiteman cabinet voicing severe criticism in July 2016. The leader of the PAR, Zita Jesus-Leito, asked for the voluntary resignation of Wiels or else her dismissal by Whiteman. Wiels was succeeded by Eunice Eisden on 23 December 2016.

A 2020 report by the Court of Audit of Curaçao (Dutch: Algemene Rekenkamer Curaçao) stated that Wiels and Prime Minister Asjes had acted unlawfully in 2015 regarding the sale of the Curaçaohuis and the buying of new property. In January 2021, coalition parties Partido MAN and Real Alternative Party called for prosecution of Wiels regarding the matter.
