= Leendert Rojer =

Curaçaoan politician

Minister Plenipotentiary of Curaçao
- In office 13 April 2017 – 1 June 2017
- Monarch: Willem Alexander
- Prime Minister: Gilmar Pisas
- Governor: Lucille George-Wout
- Preceded by: Eunice Eisden
- Succeeded by: Anthony Begina

Leendert A.B. Rojer is a Curaçaoan politician. He was Minister Plenipotentiary of Curaçao between 13 April 2017 and 1 June 2017. The coalition parties of the Gilmar Pisas cabinet asked him to take care of the position until a new government was formed after the 2017 Curaçao general election. He was succeeded by Anthony Begina on 1 June 2017.
