= Irene Dick =

Curaçaoan politician

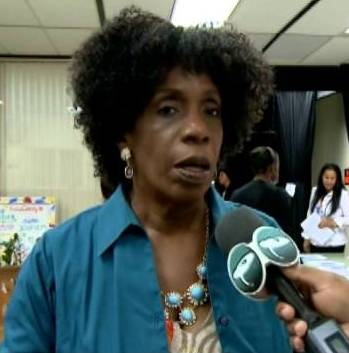

Minister of Education, Science, Culture and Sport
- In office 23 December 2013 – 23 December 2016
- Prime Minister: Ivar Asjes; Ben Whiteman
- Preceded by: Rubia Bitorina; Ivar Asjes (acting)

Personal details
- Born: 28 November 1949 (age 76) Willemstad, Curaçao
- Party: Sovereign People

Irene Dick (born 28 November 1949) is a Curaçaoan politician. A member of the Sovereign People, she was Minister of Education, Science, Culture and Sport from 23 December 2013 until 23 December 2016. Dick replaced Ivar Asjes, who held the office while concurrently Prime Minister since the resignation of Rubia Bitorina.

== Career ==
Dick was born on 28 November 1949, in Willemstad. Before her term as Minister she had a career in education and was director of the Fundashon Material pa Skol (FMS).

In June 2015, Dick faced criticism from high school students and their parents after raising the possibility of deviating Curaçaoan exam standards from those in the Netherlands. Dick later retracted a letter she had sent to school boards and argued for a national dialogue on education.

After the resignation of Asjes, Dick stayed on as Minister during the first two cabinets of Ben Whiteman.

Dick was replaced by Elsa Rozendal in the Hensley Koeiman cabinet which was installed on 23 December 2016.
