= Nelson Navarro =

Curaçaoan politician and jurist

Minister of Justice
- In office 31 December 2012 – 23 December 2016
- Prime Minister: Daniel Hodge; Ivar Asjes; Ben Whiteman
- Preceded by: Stanley Betrian
- Succeeded by: Ornelio Martina

Personal details
- Born: 19 January 1949 (age 77)
- Citizenship: Curaçao
- Party: Independent
- Other political affiliations: Forsa Kòrsou (until 2010)
- Children: 5
- Education: Leiden University
- Occupation: Lawyer

Nelson Navarro (born 19 January 1949) is a Curaçaoan jurist and politician. He was Minister of Justice of Curaçao from December 2012 to December 2016.

== Biography ==
Navarro was born in 1949 and went to high school in Curaçao. In 1976 he earned a degree in Dutch law at the Leiden University in the Netherlands. He returned to Curaçao the same year to work as a paralegal at the Central Bureau of Judicial and General Affairs. Three years later he moved once again to the Netherlands to work as a civil servant at the tax service and to study about customs and tariffs. Once he finished the course he went to work at the Central Bureau of Judicial and General Affairs in Curaçao again. He became deputy-head of the organisation in 1982. He held this position until 1987. In 1987 he became a lawyer, and from that year until 2006 he worked at several law firms.

== Political career ==
In 2006 Navarro was one of the co-founders of the political party Forsa Kòrsou. Navarro himself obtained a seat in the Estates of the Netherlands Antilles the same year. After the dissolution of the Netherlands Antilles in 2010 Navarro returned to his work as a lawyer. In 2012 he was invited to join the "Task cabinet" of Prime Minister Daniel Hodge as Minister of Justice. He was confirmed with the rest of the cabinet on 31 December 2012. He served on behalf of the Partido pa Adelanto I Inovashon Soshal (PAIS). After the cabinet of Hodge resigned, a new cabinet under Ivar Asjes was formed. Under Asjes Navarro was kept as Minister of Justice and confirmed on 7 June 2013. In September 2013 Navarro offered his resignation to the Estates of Curaçao after a suspect in the murder investigation around Helmin Wiels killed himself in a police cell complex located in Barber, Curaçao. The suspect had days before been relocated from the highly guarded Marinekazerne Suffisant. After giving an explanation to the Estates Navarro retained his position. In March 2014 Navarro spoke with Dutch justice minister Ivo Opstelten regarding Dutch help to fight crime on Curaçao. The Koninklijke Marechaussee later that year sent 10 detectives.

Early in 2016 Navarro came into conflict with some union members of the Curaçao members of Dutch Caribbean Coast Guard after he made statements that some members of the coast guard were criminals. In June 2016 it was revealed that Navarro on 8 February 2015 had drunk coffee with rat poison in it while being at the government building Fort Amsterdam. The amount of poison was not enough to be lethal. Earlier notices reported that Navarro was to be assassinated by Venezuelan hitmen while attending a carnaval parade. Navarro was warned and did not attend the parade.

Navarro was replaced by Ornelio Martina in the Hensley Koeiman cabinet which was installed on 23 December 2016.

== Personal life ==
Navarro is married and has five children.
