= Ministry of Justice (Curaçao) =

The Ministry of Justice of Curaçao is "responsible for the legal order, law enforcement, security and public order within the country of Curaçao." The ministry primarily focuses on the following:

- Developing policies
- Overseeing judicial legislation
- Contributing to the functional quality of its partners in safety care;
- Ensuring the safety, order and peace in the Curaçao society, its citizens, and its visitors

== List of ministers (Post-2010 upon establishing autonomy) ==
- Elmer Wilsoe (2010–2012)
- Nelson Navarro (2012–2016)
- Ornelio Martina (2016–2017)
- Gilmar Pisas (2017)
- Quincy Girigorie (2017–2021)
- Shalten Hato (2021- )

== See also ==
- Justice ministry
- List of cabinets of Curaçao
- Politics of Curaçao
