= Anthony Begina =

Dutch politician

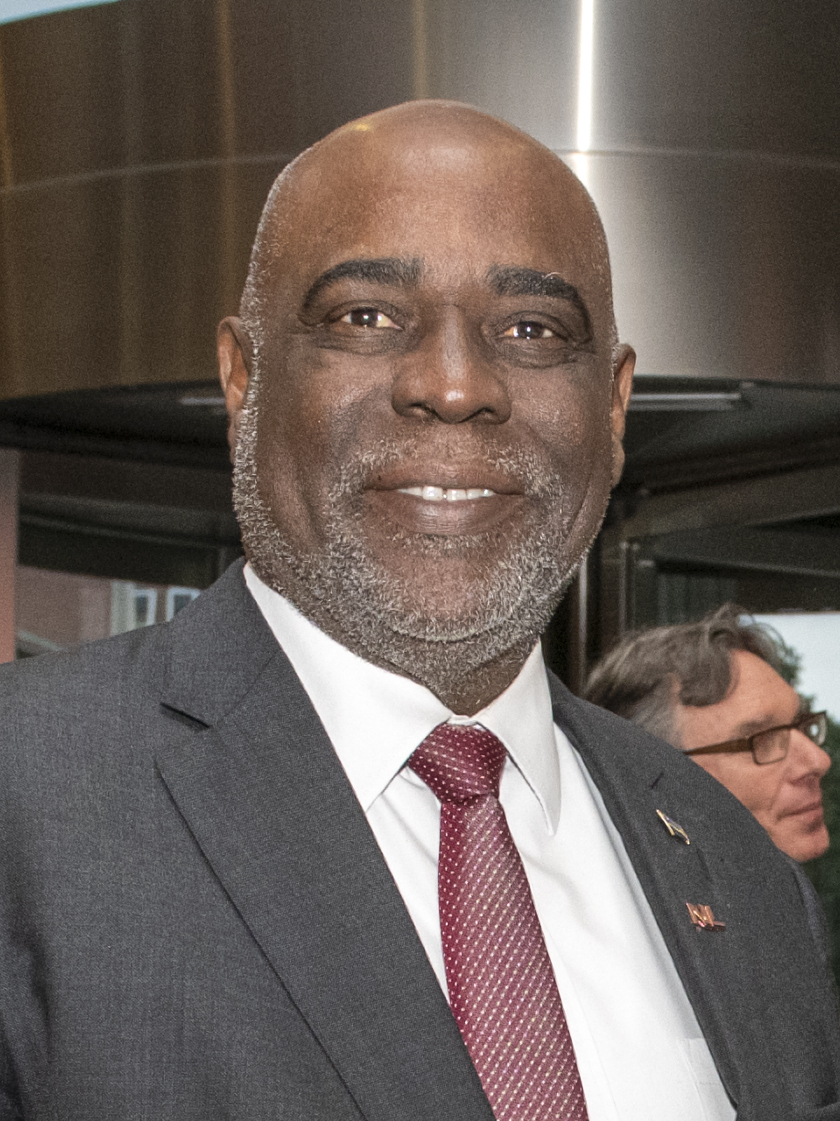
- Begina in 2019

Minister Plenipotentiary of Curaçao
- In office 1 June 2017 – 14 June 2021
- Monarch: Willem-Alexander
- Preceded by: Leendert Rojer
- Succeeded by: Carlson Manuel

Personal details
- Born: 1954 (age 71–72)
- Party: Real Alternative Party

Anthony Begina (born 1954) is a Dutch politician, who served as the Minister Plenipotentiary of Curaçao from June 2017 until June 2021.

Begina had previously served as Deputy Minister Plenipotentiary of Curaçao since 27 January 2016.
