= Jaime Córdoba (politician) =

Curaçaoan politician (1950–2024)

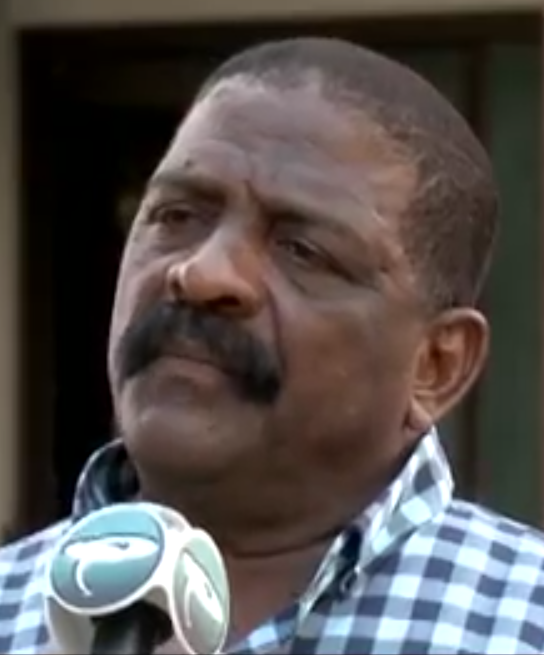
- Córdoba in 2014

Minister for Social Development, Work and Welfare
- In office 23 December 2016 – 29 May 2017
- Prime Minister: Hensley Koeiman; Gilmar Pisas
- Preceded by: Ruthmilda Larmonie-Cecilia
- Succeeded by: Hensley Koeiman

Member of the Estates of Curaçao
- In office 29 April 2017 – 11 May 2021
- In office 2010 – 23 December 2016

Vice President of the Estates of Curaçao
- In office 2012 – 8 December 2015
- Succeeded by: Humphrey Davelaar

Personal details
- Born: 11 October 1950 Netherlands Antilles (now Curaçao)
- Died: 15 December 2024 (aged 74) Groningen, the Netherlands
- Party: Sovereign People (Pueblo Soberano, PS) (until 2020), Independent (after 2020)

Jaime Córdoba (11 October 1950 – 15 December 2024) was a Curaçaoan politician of the Sovereign People (PS) political party. Between 23 December 2016 and 29 May 2017, he was Minister for Social Development, Work, and Welfare. He was a member of the Estates of Curaçao between 2010 and December 2016 and once more from 2017 until 2021. He served as vice president of the Estates between 2012 and 2015. From December 2015 until October 2018 Córdoba served as political leader of the Sovereign People political party. He was the party leader in the Estates from December 2015 until he was appointed Minister.

== Life and career ==
Córdoba was born in Netherlands Antilles on 11 October 1950. He originally worked as a policeman. He was a member of the Estates of Curaçao for Sovereign People since the dissolution of the Netherlands Antilles on 10 October 2010. On 2 November 2012, he was elected as Vice-President of the Estates. The same month Córdoba stated that he was offered 2 million Netherlands Antillean guilder to withdraw his support from the government, which was based on 11 of 21 seats of the Estates.

Then in May 2013 the leader of Sovereign People, Helmin Wiels, who saw Córdoba as a future candidate for a post as Minister was assassinated. When the cabinet of Prime Minister Ivar Asjes was formed Córdoba could have become Minister of Social Affairs, Work & Welfare. He however decided against it, as to not lose party experience in the Estates and let Jeanne-Marie Francisca become minister.

Córdoba was succeeded as Vice President of the Estates on 8 December 2015 by Humphrey Davelaar. He was the political leader of Pueblo Soberano since 14 December 2015, when he succeeded Helmin Wiels. He was the sole candidate in the party elections. Córdoba became faction leader of Pueblo Soberano in the Estates on 16 December 2015, taking over from Melvin Cijntje.

Córdoba was named Minister for Social Development, Work and Welfare in the Hensley Koeiman cabinet which was installed on 23 December 2016. His appointment ended his term in the Estates. He kept his position in the cabinet of Gilmar Pisas, which took office on 24 March 2017. On 29 May 2017, the Pisas cabinet was succeeded by that of Eugene Rhuggenaath. After the 2017 general election the PS obtained one seat, which was occupied by Córdoba. In October 2018, Córdoba was succeeded as leader of Sovereign People by Ben Whiteman. In December 2020 Córdoba left Sovereign People and continued as an independent member in the Estates. He remained in the Estates until the new Estates convened for the first time after the 2021 Curaçao general election, on 11 May 2021.

In the final years of his life Córdoba lived in the Netherlands. He died in a nursing home in Groningen, on 15 December 2024, at the age of 74.
