= Norman Girigorie =

Curaçao football manager

Personal information
- Place of birth: Netherlands Antilles

Managerial career
- Years: Team
- 1992: Netherlands Antilles (assistant)
- 2012: Curaçao (assistant)
- 2014: CSD Barber
- 2015: Curaçao (interim)

Norman "Nooi" Girigorie is a Curaçao professional manager.

== Career ==
In 1992, he helped to train Netherlands Antilles national football team. In 2012, he worked as assistant of head coach of the Curaçao national football team. In 2014, he coached the CSD Barber. Since 28 January until 1 March 2015, he was a head coach of the Curaçao national football team.

== Honours ==
=== Club ===
CSD Barber

- Sekshon Pagá: 2014
