= Minister Plenipotentiary of Curaçao =

Government minister of the Netherlands

The Minister Plenipotentiary of Curaçao (Dutch: Gevolmachtigd Minister van Curaçao) represents the constituent country (Dutch: land) of Curaçao in the Council of Ministers of the Kingdom of the Netherlands. The current Minister Plenipotentiary of Curaçao is Carlson Manuel. The Minister Plenipotentiary and his cabinet are seated in the "Curaçaohuis" (Curaçao House) in The Hague (which was the location of the Antillenhuis before the dissolution of the Netherlands Antilles).

A significant difference between the Netherlands Ministers and the Ministers Plenipotentiary is that the former Ministers are accountable for their politics and policies to the Dutch parliament. The Ministers Plenipotentiary, however, are accountable to their national governments. Therefore, the Ministers Plenipotentiary usually do not resign in the event of a Dutch cabinet crisis.

== List of ministers plenipotentiary of Curaçao ==
The following table lists the ministers plenipotentiary of Curaçao that have been in office since Curaçao became a country in the Kingdom of the Netherlands in 2010:

Name	Period	Party	Reference
Sheldry Osepa	10 October 2010 – 13 February 2013	MFK	
Roderick Pieters	13 February 2013 – 7 June 2013	PS	
Marvelyne Wiels	7 June 2013 – 23 December 2016	PS	
Eunice Eisden	23 December 2016 – 13 April 2017	Partido MAN	
Leendert Rojer	13 April 2017 – 1 June 2017		
Anthony Begina	1 June 2017 – June 2021	PAR	
Carlson Manuel	14 June 2021 –	MFK	
