= COVID-19 pandemic in Curaçao =

Ongoing COVID-19 viral pandemic in Curaçao

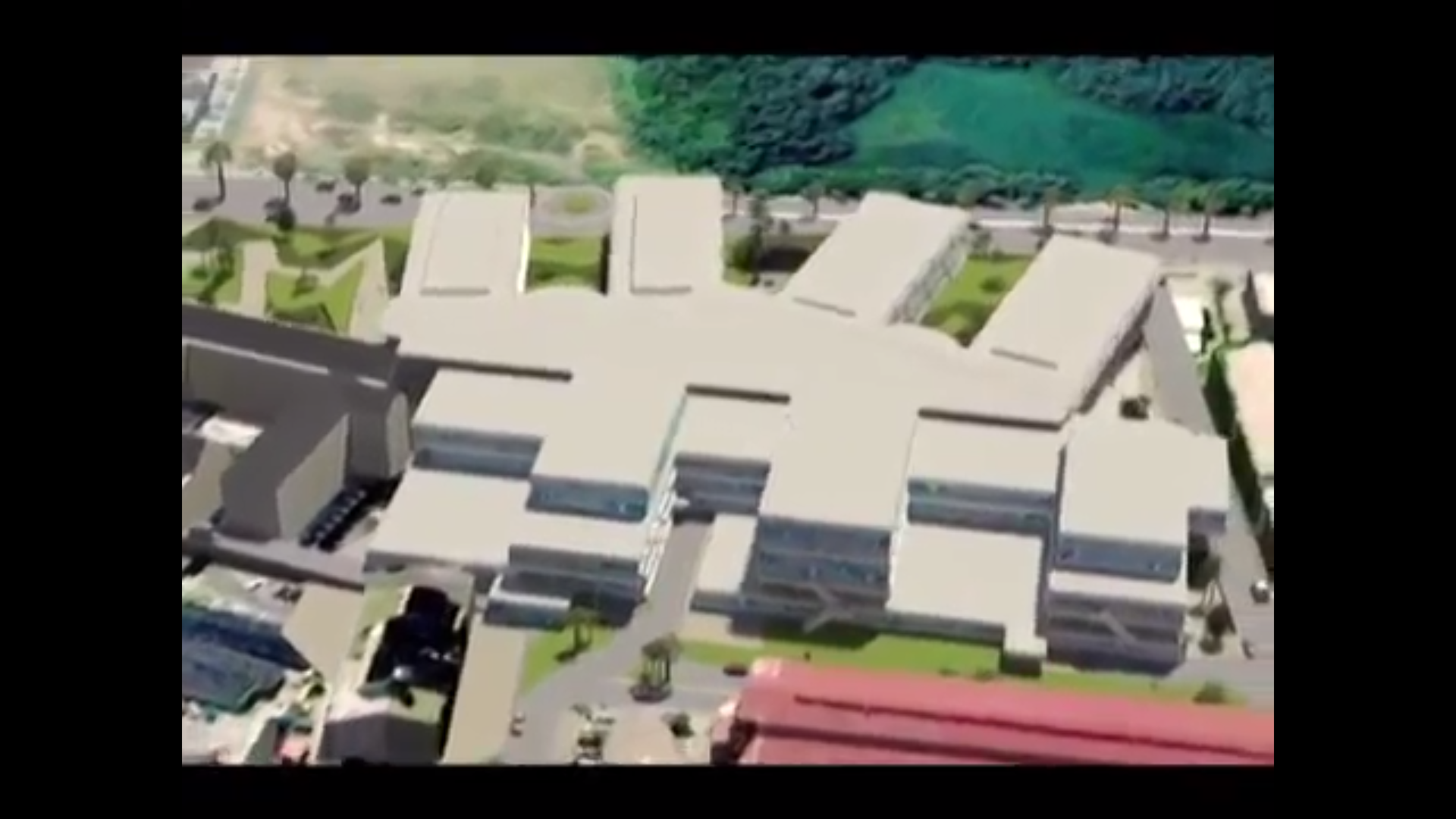
- Disease: COVID-19
- Pathogen: SARS-CoV-2
- Location: Curaçao
- First outbreak: Wuhan, China
- Arrival date: 13 March 2020 (6 years, 8 months and 1 week)
- Confirmed cases: 39,133 (2022-03-10)
- Recovered: 38,533
- Deaths: 264

Government website
- Government of Curaçao

The COVID-19 pandemic in Curaçao was a part of the ongoing global viral pandemic of coronavirus disease 2019 (COVID-19), which was documented for the first time in Curaçao on 13 March 2020. The case was a 68-year-old man who was on vacation from the Netherlands. By 9 July 2020, all cases resolved. On 15 July, a new case was discovered, and on 6 August all cases resolved again briefly until 10 August.

== Background ==
On 12 January 2020, the World Health Organization (WHO) confirmed that a novel coronavirus was the cause of a respiratory illness in a cluster of people in Wuhan, Hubei, China, which was reported to the WHO on 31 December 2019.

The case fatality ratio for COVID-19 has been much lower than SARS of 2003, but the transmission has been significantly greater, with a significant total death toll.

== Timeline ==
Cases

Deaths

=== March ===
On 13 March 2020, Prime Minister Eugene Rhuggenaath announced the first confirmed case of coronavirus in the country - a 68-year-old man who arrived from the Netherlands and had been vacationing in Curaçao. The second case was expected as it is the spouse of the first case. Since then everyone who has been in contact with the couple has been tested. Most of the cases came out negative but the results of two cases remain unsure and are under observation.

Following the announcement, the country announced that all flights coming from Europe would be halted.

On 18 March 2020, the first-diagnosed case in the country (68 year-old Dutch man) died at the Curaçao Medical Center. Two other cases were still being treated as of the 23rd.

On 27 March 2020, it was announced that an employee of the laboratory of the Curaçao Medical Center had tested positive. He had not been in contact with patients. As a precaution nine of his direct colleagues had been quarantined.

=== April ===
On 8 April 2020, it was announced that the ladies at the regulated brothel "Campo Alegre" / large open-air brothel called "Le Mirage" or "Campo Alegre" were allowed to be repatriated, however many feared losing their $500,- deposit.

On 9 April 2020, Raymond Knops, Dutch Minister of the Interior and Kingdom Relations, offered Curaçao an emergency loan of €90 million.

On 11 April 2020, medical supplies including 12 ICU beds had been sent from the Netherlands. This shipment will increase the number of ICU beds to 50.

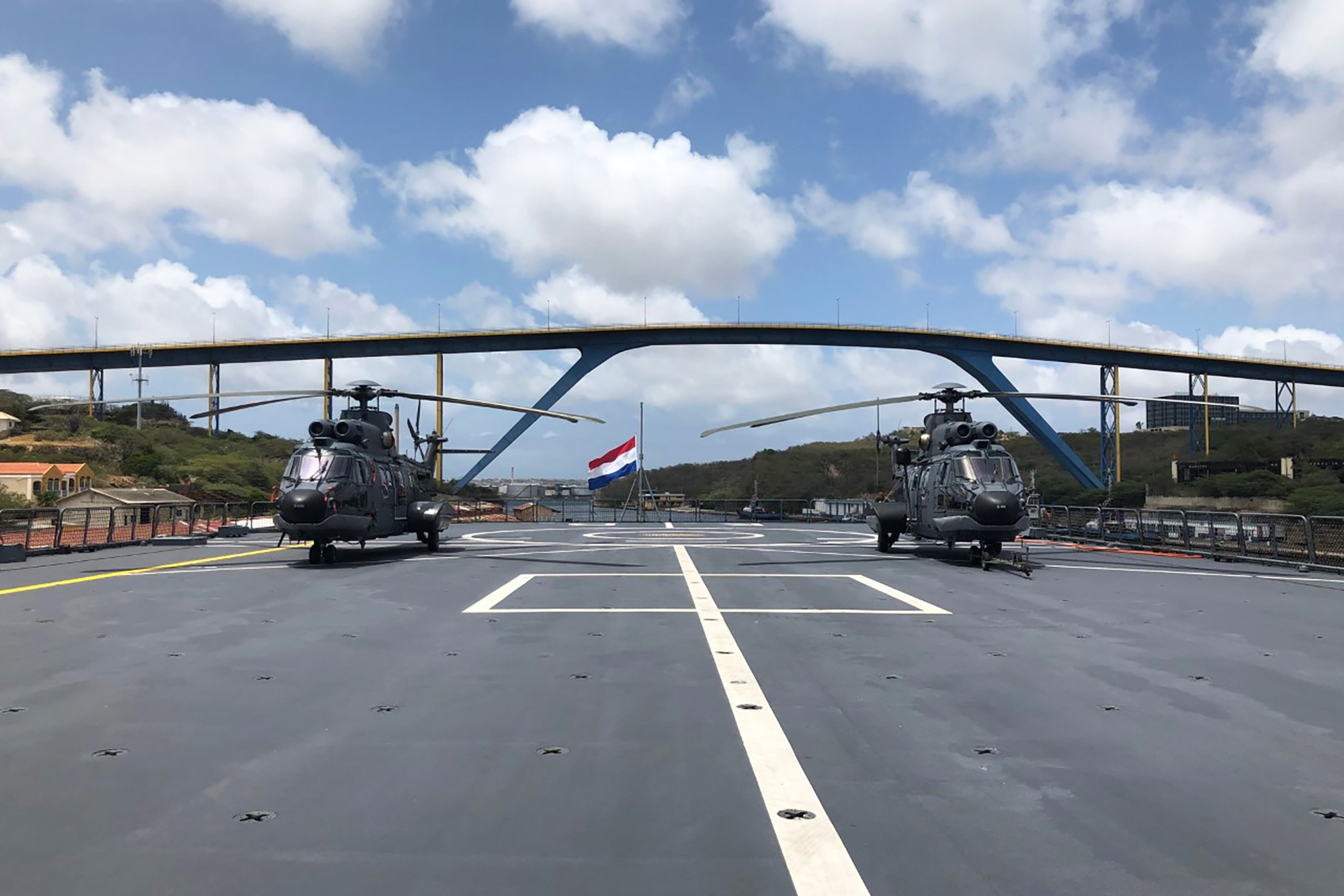
Joint logistic support ship Karel Doorman in Willemstad harbor on 14 May 2020

On 13 April 2020, Zr. Ms. Karel Doorman was dispatched from Den Helder to assist with food aid, border control and public order. A coordination point in Martinique was set up to coordinate the border controls of the Dutch Caribbean, France and United Kingdom.

On 15 April 2020, Suzanne Camelia-Römer, the Minister of Health, announced that the Netherlands will send 82 American health care workers to Curaçao paid by the Dutch government, and that the Curaçao government has hired 28 health care workers from Cuba.

On 17 April 2020, the government announced a financial support program for companies, employees and the unemployed.

On 18 April 2020, Dr. Izzy Gerstenbluth announced that 286 have been tested and that 1,500 people have been repatriated. A step by step easing of measures is being planned.

On 21 April 2020, certain shops are allowed to open for delivery and the beaches are open between 06:00 and 09:00.

On 23 April 2020, all unemployed or underemployed will receive a food pass. The amount varies between 150 and 450 guilders.
Unregistered migrants mainly from Venezuela are eligible for food packages, but no monetary support, if they register.

On 24 April 2020, it was announced that there are now 16 positive cases. One of the two inclusive tests came back positive, and one of the American health workers who had tested positive before boarding, but decided to fly anyhow. There's a possibility that others have been infected. Curaçao, Aruba and the Netherlands have decided to return the American health workers due to breach of contract.

On 28 April 2020, the US Consulate has arranged for a repatriation flight on 10 May for American citizens stranded on Aruba, Bonaire, and Curaçao. The plane will leave from Queen Beatrix International Airport in Aruba and proceed to Hollywood International Airport in Fort Lauderdale.

On 29 April 2020, 500 Curaçao students living in the Netherlands have petitioned the governments of Curaçao and the Netherlands for repatriation. The students no longer have a sedula which is a Permanent residency status, and were therefore not eligible for the reparation flights which had taken place. On 30 April, Zita Jesus-Leito, Minister of Traffic and Transport, announced that reparation is not possible until at least 10 May. There are an additional 200 people stuck in the United States, the Netherlands, Colombia, Dominican Republic, Venezuela, and other countries.

=== May ===
On 6 May, there will be repatriation flight for stranded travellers from the Netherlands and Europe.

=== June ===
On 9 June, Dr Izzy Gerstenbluth said that opening the borders on 1 July for travellers and tourists from the Netherlands is manageable, however Americans are too much of a risk. Tourists and travellers from Belgian and Germans have been allowed to travel without quarantine as well.

=== July ===
On 9 July, Dr Izzy Gerstenbluth announced that there are no more active infections on the island.

On 15 July, a news case was discovered.

=== August ===
On 6 August, all cases resolved, and there were no active cases.

On 10 August, a new case was discovered. A crew member who was already in quarantine tested positive.

On 19 August, the case count was revised down to 35, because one of the new cases tested was a crew member who had been previously tested.

== Preventive measures ==
On 15 March 2020, it was announced that all travel from Europe has been suspended.

On 16 March 2020, all international flights were suspended. All gatherings with 10 or more people are banned. People are asked to shelter in place.

On 17 March 2020, all schools closed. From 4 May onwards day-care will reopen, and high school students in their last year will resume on 18 May. On 11 May schools are allowed to open after inspection and approval. As of 1 June, all schools will reopen.

On 28 March 2020, a curfew between 21:00 and 06:00 was implemented. Curfew will remain in effect after 8 May.

On 30 March 2020, everybody was ordered to stay at home.

On 1 April 2020, it was announced that vehicles will only be allowed on the road on specific days depending on their licence plate, and that every Sunday there will be a complete lockdown with nobody allowed outside.

From 4 May 2020 onward, some businesses can reopen under strict conditions.

From 8 May 2020 onward, shelter in place will be lifted, businesses can reopen, restaurants and bars remain take away only, and gatherings over 25 people are prohibited. The licence plate of the day restriction will also be lifted.

As of 22 May, the curfew has been eased to 00:00 to 06:00. Eating in restaurants and snack bars is allowed and they are allowed be open until 22:00. Casinos can reopen.

As of 12 June, travel between Curaçao and the BES islands (Bonaire, St. Eustatius and Saba) will be possible without quarantine. On 15 June, Sint Maarten/Saint Martin and Aruba will be added.

As of 1 July, Curaçao will open its borders with the European Union.

== 24 June austerity riots ==
The COVID-19 pandemic resulted in austerity measures. Curaçao had to impose spending cuts in order to qualify for additional aid from the Netherlands. As part of the austerity package, the Government of Curaçao announced a 12.5% cut on benefits for civil servants. Due to the Corona pandemic 80,000 people, about half the population, are dependent on food aid. In June there were several demonstrations, and the Queen Juliana Bridge had been closed by protesters.

On 24 June, a group of civil servants, who were joined by waste collectors from Selikor who faced dismissal as part of the cut backs, marched to Fort Amsterdam, where the Government is located, and demanded to speak with Prime Minister Eugene Rhuggenaath The demonstration turned into a riot during which the police cleared the square in front of Fort Amsterdam using tear gas. The city centre of Willemstad was later plundered. 48 people have been arrested, the city districts of Punda and Otrobanda were placed under lock-down until 25 June 05:00. A general curfew had been announced from 20:30 until 06:00. Mauricio Samba, the Chief of Police, resigned because he failed to protect the Government buildings. The night was restless with several abandoned buildings burning down, as was the next day, however curfew would not be extended as of 25 June.

== Statistics ==
=== Fourth wave ===
Chronology of the number of active cases, December 2021 - March 2022

View source data.

=== Third wave ===
Chronology of the number of active cases, February - November 2021

View source data.

=== Second wave ===
Chronology of the number of active cases, August 2020 - January 2021

View source data.

=== First wave ===
Chronology of the number of active cases, March - July 2020

View source data.

Note: data from 17 June to 30 June is missing.

== See also ==
- Caribbean Public Health Agency
- COVID-19 pandemic by country and territory
- COVID-19 pandemic in North America
