= Hensley Koeiman =

Curaçaoan politician

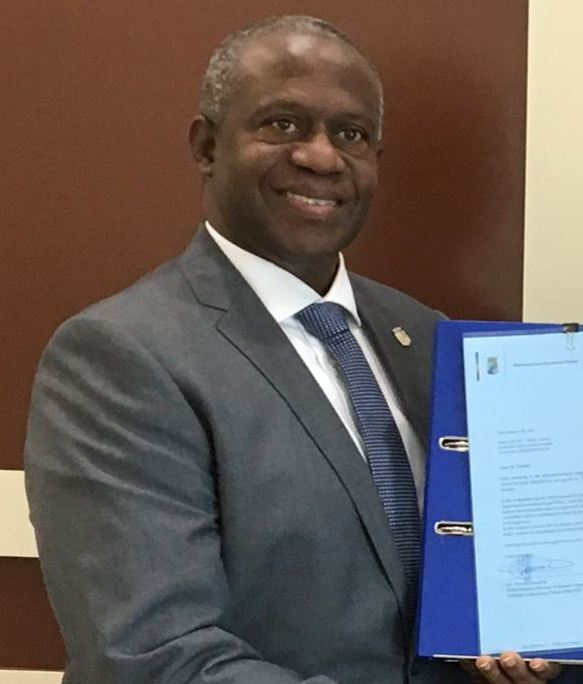
- Koeiman in 2017

6th Prime Minister of Curaçao
- In office 23 December 2016 – 24 March 2017
- Monarch: Willem-Alexander
- Governor: Lucille George-Wout
- Preceded by: Ben Whiteman
- Succeeded by: Gilmar Pisas

Minister of Social Affairs, Employment and Welfare
- In office 29 May 2017 – 14 June 2021
- Prime Minister: Eugene Rhuggenaath
- Preceded by: Jaime Córdoba
- In office 10 October 2010 – 29 September 2012
- Prime Minister: Gerrit Schotte
- Preceded by: post created

Personal details
- Born: 21 May 1956 (age 70)
- Party: Partido MAN

Hensley Felix Koeiman (born 21 May 1956) is a Curaçaoan politician who served as the sixth prime minister of Curaçao between 23 December 2016 and 24 March 2017. A member of the Partido MAN, he was Minister of Social Affairs, Employment and Welfare in the Gerrit Schotte cabinet (October 2010 – September 2012). Afterwards Koeiman served in the Parliament of Curaçao from the 2012 general election until his appointment as prime minister. Since 29 May 2017 he has been Minister of Social Affairs, Employment and Welfare in the Eugene Rhuggenaath cabinet.

== Career ==
Koeiman was born in Wacawa, Banda Bou, Curaçao, on 21 May 1956. He went to the Netherlands to study architectural engineering at the Hogere technische school in Tilburg. Koeiman worked as a teacher of architectural engineering at a Middelbare technische school. He was also head of the country building service of the Netherlands Antilles as well as head of the facilitary services of the Bank of the Netherlands Antilles.

From 2007 until the dissolution of the Netherlands Antilles on 10 October 2010, Koeiman was member of the island council of Curaçao. He was number five of the candidate list for the 2010 Curaçao general election.

On 1 June 2013 Koeiman was elected Partido MAN party leader and succeeded Charles Cooper.

Koeiman was lijsttrekker for the Partido MAN for the 2016 Curaçao general election. His party won the most votes, resulting in four seats in the Estates. Koeiman stated he was ready to take a role in government. On 14 December a coalition agreement was signed between the Partido MAN, the Party for the Restructured Antilles (PAR), National People's Party (PNP) and Sovereign People (PS). Kenneth Gijsbertha of the Partido Man had been formateur. Koeiman was designated as Prime Minister of Curaçao. A new cabinet could not be immediately installed pending screening of the ministers.

== Prime minister ==
Koeiman's cabinet was sworn in by Governor George-Wout on 23 December 2016. Seven members of Parliament joined the cabinet.

Ministry	Minister	Period	Party
Prime Minister	Hensley Koeiman	23 December 2016 – 24 March 2017	Partido MAN
Minister for Education, Science, Culture and Sport	Elsa Rozendal	23 December 2016 – 24 March 2017	Partido MAN
Minister for Social Development, Work and Welfare	Jaime Córdoba	23 December 2016 – 24 March 2017	Sovereign People
Minister for Justice	Ornelio Martina	23 December 2016 – 24 March 2017	National People's Party
Minister for Governance, Planning and Service	Ruthmilda Larmonie-Cecilia	23 December 2016 – 24 March 2017	Sovereign People
Minister for Finance	Kenneth Gijsbertha	23 December 2016 – 24 March 2017	Partido MAN
Minister for Traffic, Transport and Urban Planning	Suzanne Camelia-Römer	23 December 2016 – 24 March 2017	National People's Party
Minister for Economic Development	Eugene Rhuggenaath	23 December 2016 – 24 March 2017	Party for the Restructured Antilles
Minister for Health, Environment and Nature	Zita Jesus-Leito	23 December 2016 – 24 March 2017	Party for the Restructured Antilles

On 12 February 2017 the Koeiman cabinet fell after Sovereign People withdrew its support in Parliament. The Sovereign People parliamentarians in their letter of withdrawal of support also announced to support a government led by the Movement for the Future of Curaçao of Gerrit Schotte. Koeiman stated that there had been pressure on his government coalition from the start. His cabinet continued as a demissionary cabinet. Koeiman announced he wished to hold new elections on 28 April 2017.

On 24 March 2017 Koeiman was succeeded as prime minister by Gilmar Pisas.

== Political career ==
On 29 May 2017 he joined the cabinet of Eugene Rhuggenaath as Minister of Social Affairs, Employment and Welfare. On 13 June 2019 he announced he was willing to vacate the position of leader of the Partido MAN. On 12 August 2019 the party granted his request and started a search for a new leader.

During the COVID-19 pandemic in Curaçao following the introduction of a lockdown, Koeiman stated that nobody would be allowed to be on the streets, with the exception of vital-care workers. This was the first time in the history of Curaçao.

== Personal life ==
Koeiman has been married to Ruthline Koeiman-Benschop since 1989. They have six children.

Political offices
Preceded by Ben Whiteman	Prime Minister of Curaçao; 2016–2017	Succeeded by Gilmar Pisas
