= 2017 Curaçao general election =

- 28 April 2017
- All 21 seats in Parliament; 11 seats needed for a majority
- Turnout: 66.40% (▼0.37 pp)
Party	Leader	Vote %	Seats	+/–
PAR	Eugene Rhuggenaath	23.3	6	+2
MAN	Hensley Koeiman	20.4	5	+1
MFK	Gerrit Schotte	19.9	5	+1
KdNT	Miro Amparo dos Santos	9.4	2	−1
PIN	Suzanne Camelia-Römer	5.3	1	New
PS	Jaime Córdoba	5.1	1	−1
MP	Marilyn Moses	4.9	1	0
This lists parties that won seats. See the complete results below.
Prime Minister before	Prime Minister after
Gilmar Pisas; MFK	Eugene Rhuggenaath; PAR

Early general elections were held in Curaçao on 28 April 2017 after the fall of the government led by Hensley Koeiman.

== Background ==
The previous general elections in 2016 resulted in the formation of a four-party coalition government consisting of MAN, the Real Alternative Party (PAR), the National People's Party (PNP) and Sovereign People (PS), headed by Hensley Koeiman of MAN. However, the PS withdrew from the coalition on 11 February 2017, causing it to lose its majority. Prime Minister Koeiman subsequently submitted his resignation to the governor. On 24 March 2017 Gilmar Pisas was sworn in as interim Prime Minister.

== Electoral system ==
The 21 members of the Estates are elected by proportional representation. Parties that won at least one seat in the 2016 election were allowed to participate and a primary election was held to determine which other parties could run. These parties were required to win the equivalent of 1% of the votes cast in the previous general election in order to participate.

== Primary election ==
A total of 14 parties registered to contest the election. Six parties were without parliamentary representation and had to participate in the primary election on 18 and 19 March 2017. Parties that won more than 792 votes (1% of the total votes in the 2016 election) qualified to participate in the election.

Party	Leader	Votes	% of 2016 turnout	Qualified
Partido Inovashon Nashonal	Suzy Camelia-Römer	2,660	3.36	Yes
Movementu Kousa Promé	René Rosalia	1,218	1.54	Yes
Workers' Liberation Front–Partido Aliansa Nobo	Amado Rojer	1,124	1.42	Yes
Democratic Party	Geraldine Scheperboer-Parris	603	0.76	No
Movementu PUSH Kòrsou	Ydellienne Heerenveen	501	0.63	No
Liberashon Klàsiko Komunidat di Kòrsou	Josefina Josepha	113	0.14	No
Total valid votes		6,219		
Invalid votes		67		
Total votes		6,286		
Source: KSE

== Results ==
Party	Votes	%	Seats	+/–
Real Alternative Party	18,368	23.30	6	+2
Partido MAN	16,070	20.39	5	+1
Movement for the Future of Curaçao	15,706	19.92	5	+1
Kòrsou di Nos Tur	7,439	9.44	2	−1
Partido Inovashon Nashonal	4,200	5.33	1	New
Sovereign People	4,028	5.11	1	−1
Movementu Progresivo	3,880	4.92	1	0
Un Kòrsou Hustu	3,206	4.07	0	−1
National People's Party	3,099	3.93	0	−2
Movementu Kousa Promé	1,975	2.51	0	0
Workers' Liberation Front–PAN	859	1.09	0	New
Total	78,830	100.00	21	0
Valid votes	78,830	98.58		
Invalid/blank votes	1,138	1.42		
Total votes	79,968	100.00		
Registered voters/turnout	120,430	66.40		
Source: KSE
