= 2016 Curaçao general election =

- 5 October 2016
- All 21 seats in Parliament; 11 seats needed for a majority
- Turnout: 66.77% (▼9.33 pp)
Party	Leader	Vote %	Seats	+/–
MAN	Hensley Koeiman	16.23	4	+2
MFK	Gerrit Schotte	16.01	4	−1
PAR	Eugene Rhuggenaath	15.10	4	0
KNT	Miro Amparo dos Santos	10.43	3	New
PNP	Humphrey Davelaar	8.87	2	+1
PS	Ben Whiteman	6.73	2	−3
UKH	Omayra Leeflang	6.12	1	New
MP	Marilyn Moses	5.23	1	New
This lists parties that won seats. See the complete results below.
Prime Minister before	Prime Minister after
Ben Whiteman; PS	Hensley Koeiman; MAN

General elections were held in Curaçao on 5 October 2016, having been postponed from 30 September due to Hurricane Matthew. A total of thirteen parties participated.

== Electoral system ==
The 21 members of the Estates were elected by proportional representation. Parties that won seats in the previous elections were allowed to participate, whilst primary elections were held to determine which other parties can run, with parties required to receive the equivalent of 1% of the vote from the previous elections in order to participate.

== Primary elections ==
Primary elections were held prior to the elections for new parties or parties that had failed to win seats in the previous elections in 2012, with parties having to obtain the equivalent of 1% of the vote in the previous elections; i.e. 870 votes.

The primary elections took place on 20 and 21 August 2016, with seven of the fifteen participating parties qualifying:

Party	Abbreviation	Leader	Votes	Qualified
Kòrsou di nos tur	KdnT	Amparo dos Santos	2,178	Yes
Movementu Patriótiko i Adelanto Sosial	PAS	Charles Cooper	1,543	Yes
Un Korsou Hustu	UKH	Omayra Leeflang	1,361	Yes
Movementu Progresivo	MP	Marylin Moses	1,240	Yes
Movementu Kousa Promé	MKP	Rene Rosalia	1,122	Yes
Democratic Party	DP	Geraldine Parris	1,094	Yes
Partido pro Kòrsou		Ivar Asjes	965	Yes
Workers' Liberation Front	FOL	Wilson Godett	622	No
Partido Reskate Integral Kòrsou	PRIK	Milangelo Isidora	505	No
1 TIM MAGNO	1TM		378	No
Partido Aliansa Nobo	PAN	Amado Rojer	280	No
Movementu Revelashon Binti	R16	Darwin de Lanoi	273	No
Partido GOOL			205	No
Fórsa Elevá/Partido Kooperativista	FE/PKP		62	No
Korsou, Un Pais Nobo	UPN	Tito Lopez	49	No
Total valid votes			11,877	
Invalid votes			245	
Total votes			12,122	
Source: KSE

== Results ==
Party	Votes	%	Seats	+/–
Partido MAN	12,839	16.23	4	+2
Movement for the Future of Curaçao	12,671	16.01	4	–1
Party for the Restructured Antilles	11,949	15.10	4	0
Kòrsou di Nos Tur	8,254	10.43	3	New
National People's Party	7,017	8.87	2	+1
Sovereign People	5,323	6.73	2	–3
Un Kòrsou Hustu	4,845	6.12	1	New
Movementu Progresivo	4,140	5.23	1	New
Partido pa Adelanto I Inovashon Soshal	3,654	4.62	0	–4
Movementu Patriótiko i Adelanto Sosial	3,452	4.36	0	New
Democratic Party	1,963	2.48	0	0
Movementu Kousa Promé	1,867	2.36	0	New
Pro Kòrsou	1,146	1.45	0	New
Total	79,120	100.00	21	0
Valid votes	79,120	98.38		
Invalid/blank votes	1,303	1.62		
Total votes	80,423	100.00		
Registered voters/turnout	120,456	66.77		
Source: KSE
