= Sheldry Osepa =

Curaçaoa politician and lawyer

Minister Plenipotentiary of Curaçao
- In office 10 October 2010 – 13 February 2013
- Preceded by: none (office established)
- Succeeded by: Roderick Pieters

Personal details
- Party: Movementu Futuro Korsou (MFK), National People's Party (PNP)

Sheldry P. Osepa is a politician and lawyer from Curaçao who was the first Minister Plenipotentiary of Curaçao. Before this, Osepa was Commissioner of Constitutional Affairs in the island government of Curaçao. When Curaçao attained country status within the Kingdom of the Netherlands on 10 October 2010, Osepa assumed his office as first Minister Plenipotentiary of Curaçao.

== Biography ==
Osepa graduated in 2002 with an LL.M. degree in Dutch law from Tilburg University in the Netherlands.

As of October 2023 he is a member of the Parliament of Curaçao for the National People's Party (PNP).
