= Lourdes Alberto =

Curaçaoan politician

Minister of Finance
- In office 24 March 2017 – 29 May 2017

Personal details
- Party: Independent
- Education: University of Curaçao

Lourdes Alberto is a Curaçaoan politician. She was Minister of Finance in the interim Pisas cabinet from 24 March 2017 to 29 May 2017.

The appointment of Lourdes Alberto took place on the recommendation of Eduard Braam, an independent member of the Estates of Curaçao and member of the Blok van 12, which formed the majority in the Estates of Curaçao under the leadership of MFK leader Gerrit Schotte. During the formation of the Koeiman cabinet, Braam broke with the PAR because he was not allowed to become a minister.

Lourdes Alberto, an independent financial consultant, took office as a non-partisan minister. She had completed her studies in business administration and accountancy at the University of the Netherlands Antilles and had subsequently worked for 15 years at PricewaterhouseCoopers in Willemstad. After her resignation, she was succeeded by Kenneth Gijsbertha.

== See also ==
- List of female finance ministers
