= Zita Jesus-Leito =

Curaçaoan politician (born 1957)

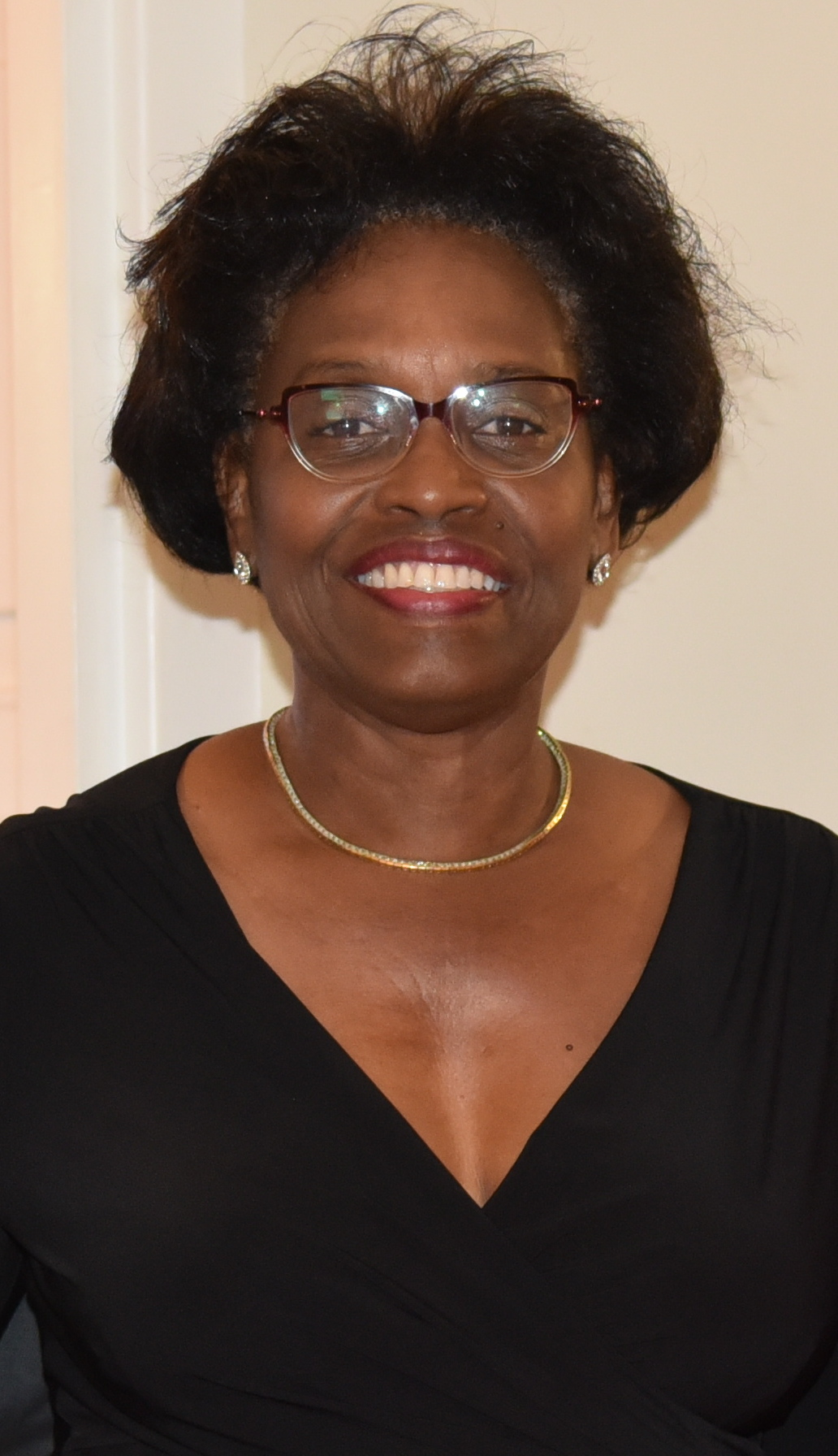
Zita Jesus-Leito in 2017

Zita Jesus-Leito (born 27 April 1957) is a Curaçaoan politician. From 2017 to 2021, she was the minister for public transportation and infrastructure. She is currently a member of the Parliament of Curaçao.

== Early life ==
Zita Jesus-Leito was born in either 1956 or 1957.

== Career ==
She was a member of the Parliament of the Netherlands Antilles for a few months in 2006; a commissioner for Curaçao three times between 2004 and 2010; and a member of the Parliament of Curaçao. In 2014, she was named the fifth leader of the Real Alternative Party. In 2017, she was appointed as a minister to Eugene Rhuggenaath's government.

In November 2020, after the completion of wheelchair-accessible infrastructure at Grote Knip Beach, members of the opposition party (Movement for the Future of Curaçao) called for her to resign, because the construction impeded normal access to the beach. As the minister for planning and transportation, she had advocated for and celebrated the infrastructure project; she admitted that it was an unlicensed project. Five months later, her party requested that she not return to parliament after her ministry ended, saying they wished for younger politicians to enter parliament. Jesus-Leito was 64 and denied the request.

Her other ministerial duties included working with World Meteorological Organization hurricane commissars in their meetings.
