= Party for Advancement and Social Innovation =

Party for Advancement and Social Innovation Papiamento: Partido pa Adelanto i Inovashon Soshal
- Founded: 23 March 2010
- Ideology: Social liberalism
- Political position: Centre
- Colours: Aqua
- Estates of Curaçao: 0 / 21

Website
- partidopais.com

The Party for Advancement and Social Innovation (Papiamento: Partido pa Adelanto i Inovashon Soshal, PAIS), sometimes translated as the Party for Social Advancement and Innovation, is a political party in Curaçao.

== History ==
The party participated in the Curaçao general election of 2010, where it obtained 3% of the vote, which was not enough for a seat in the 21 seat Island council of Curaçao, which became the Estates of Curaçao upon the dissolution of the Netherlands Antilles in 2010.

PAIS entered the Estates of Curaçao in 2012 with 4 seats.

During the 2016 general election, no PAIS candidate earned enough votes to be granted any seats, however Marilyn Moses sits as PAIS following the opening of the new legislature. Party leader Alex Rosaria resigned early October. The party started a period of contemplation, and did not participate in the 2017 elections.
