= History of Curaçao =

The history of Curaçao starts with settlement by the Arawakan-speaking Indigenous people who migrated from the South American mainland. They are believed to have inhabited the island for many hundreds of years before the arrival of Europeans.

== Pre-colonial history ==
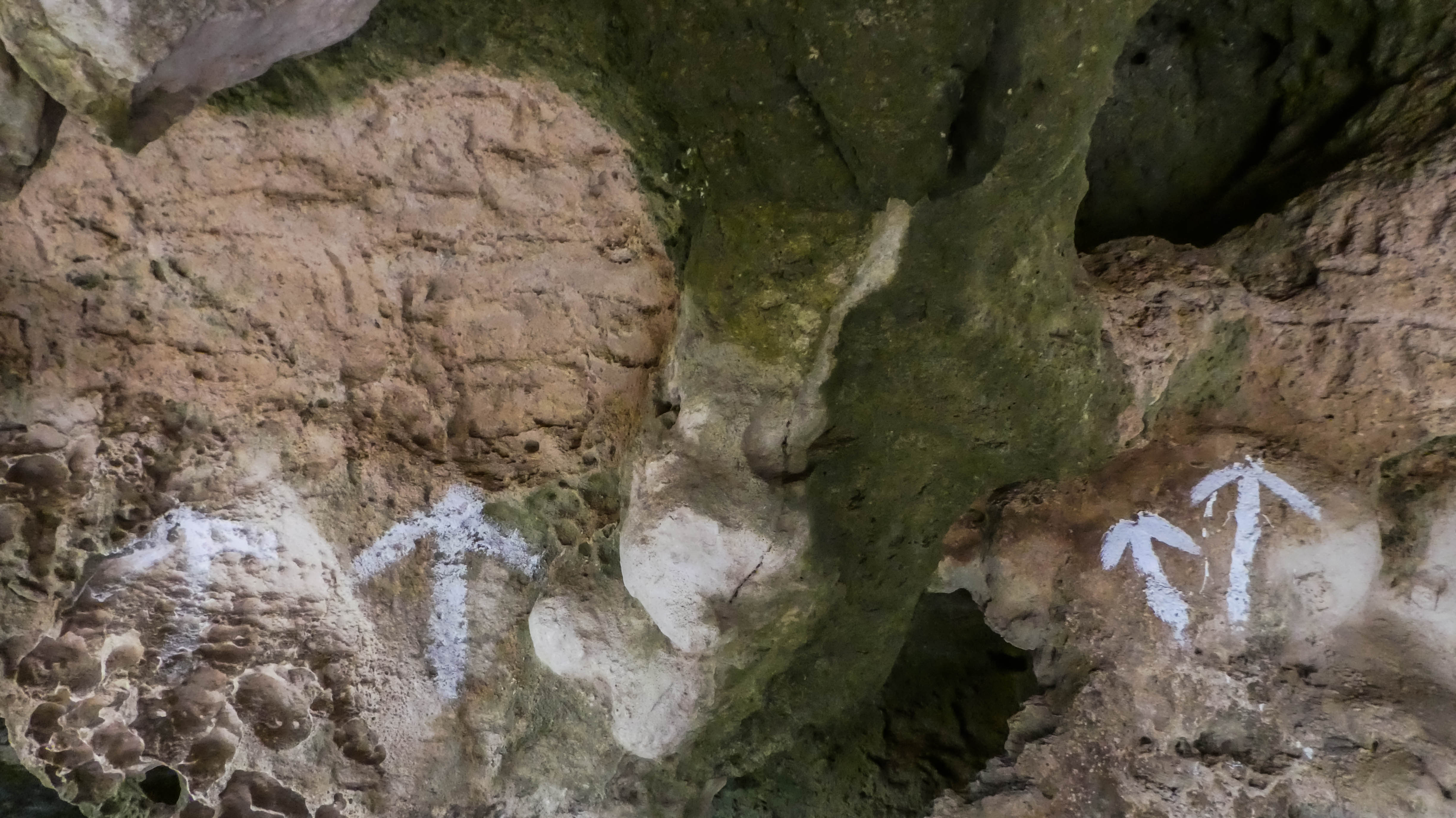
1500 year-old petroglyphs near Hato Caves.

The earliest trace of human habitation on Curaçao can be found in Rooi Rincon. It consists in a natural overhang in the rocks used by preceramic residents. The remains that have been found consist of waste heaps of shell, animal bone material and stone. The objects are made of stone and shell, which can be used for different purposes. There are also rock paintings here. The dating of these oldest remains of Curaçao is between about 2900 and 2300 BCE. Similar remains and human graves are known from Sint Michielsberg, c. 2000 to 1600 BCE. However, a recent study on charcoal material at the site of Saliña Sint Marie points towards human activity taking place as early as c. 3700 BCE.

Remains of pottery from the ceramic period have been found at, among others, Knip and San Juan. The dates are between ca. 450 and 1500 CE. The material belongs to the Dabajuroid culture, specifically the Caquetio people, who came from nearby northwestern Venezuela. On the basis of their language, these Indigenous inhabitants are categorized as Arawakan speakers. The Caquetíos lived in small settlements with up to about 40 inhabitants. The villages were often located near inland bays, mainly on the south coast. The later Caquetíos lived from small-scale cultivation of cassava, fishing, collecting shellfish, and hunting small game. In addition, they traded with fellow natives from other islands and from the mainland. Residences have been found at, among others, Knip and Santa Barbara.

Scientific investigation of the first inhabitants of the Netherlands Antilles started in the 19th century, notably with amateur A.J. van Koolwijk who made the first field explorations. He also made an inventory of the petroglyphs on the island. Since then, many have dealt with the earliest inhabitants of Curaçao.

== European colonization ==
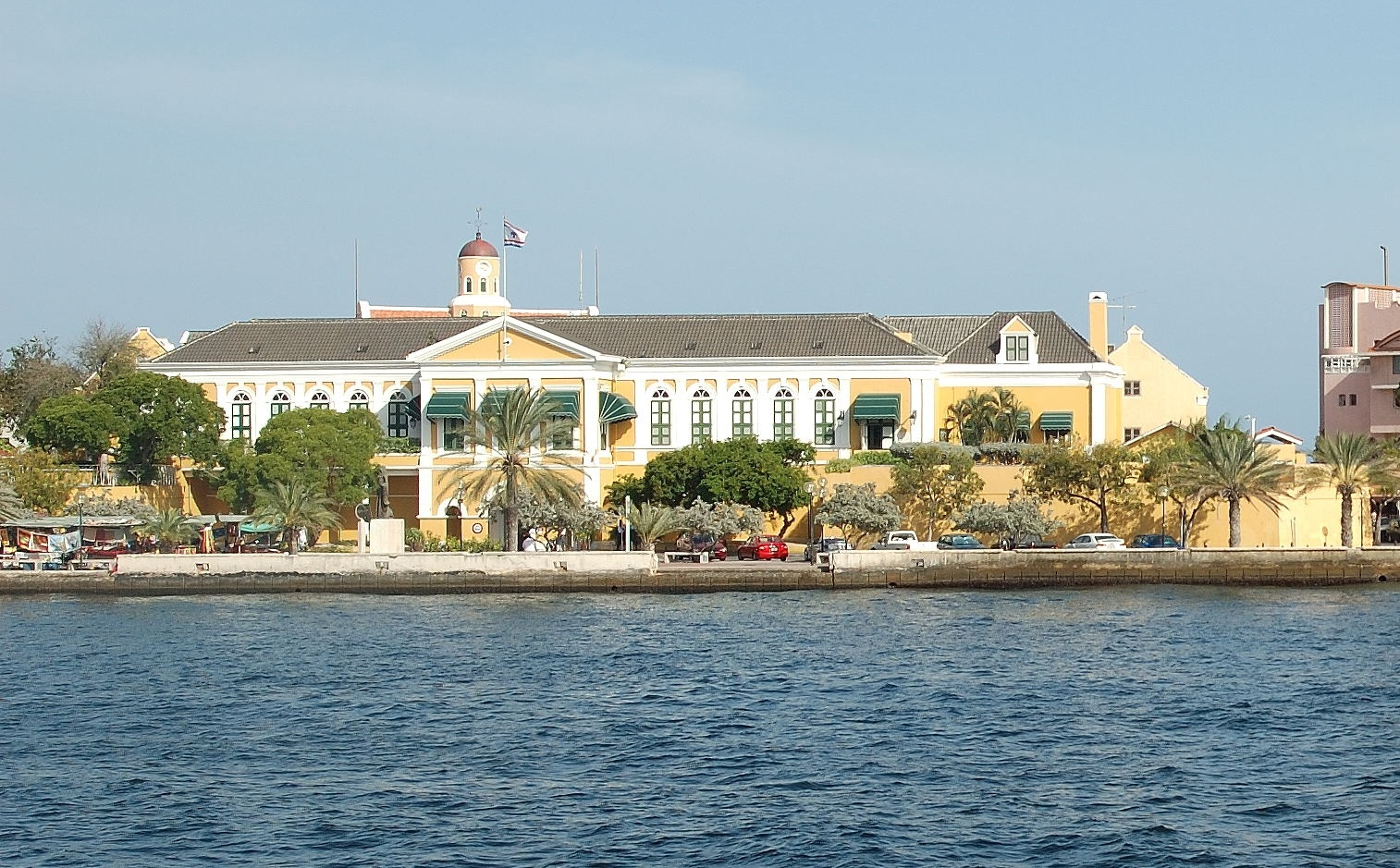
Fort Amsterdam as seen from sea

=== Spanish period ===
Spaniard Alonso de Ojeda became the first European to visit Curaçao on 26 July 1499. At that time about 2,000 Caquetios lived on the island. By 1515 almost all Caquetios were enslaved and taken away to Hispaniola. The Spanish settled on the island in 1527 and governed it from one of the Spanish-Venezuelan cities. The Spanish imported many non-native animals and plants to Curaçao. Horses, sheep, goats, pigs, and cattle were introduced from Europe or other Spanish colonies. Various non-native trees and plants were also planted by the Spaniards.

That was often a matter of trial and error. The Spanish did learn to use crops and farming methods of the Caquetio. Parallels on other Caribbean islands are known from sources. Not all imported species were equally successful. Herding went well in general; the Spanish released cattle in the kunuku (fields) and on the savannas. The cattle were herded by Caquetio and Spanish herders. Sheep, goats and cattle did relatively well. According to historical sources, there were thousands on the island. On the other hand, agriculture was not nearly as successful. Because the yields of Curaçao agriculture were disappointing, the salt pans did not have a high yield and no precious metals could be found, the Spaniards called the island an isla inutil, a useless island.

After a while, the number of Spaniards living on Curaçao declined. By contrast, the number of Native residents stabilized. Presumably there was even population increase of the Caquetio due to natural growth, return and colonization. In the last decades of Spanish occupation, Curaçao was used as a large livestock ranch. A few Spaniards lived around Santa Barbara, Santa Ana, and in villages on the western part of the island. Caquetio lived all over the island.

=== Takeover by the Dutch West India Company ===
The Netherlands effectively separated from Spain in 1581 and the Dutch West India Company (WIC) was chartered in 1621. In 1633, the WIC lost its base in the Antilles when a Spanish fleet destroyed its settlement on Sint Maarten. The WIC took interest in Curaçao as a new base for trade and privateering, using its excellent natural harbor, and for salt production (to preserve fish, notably herring). Good salt pans could be found both on the coast of Venezuela and on Bonaire. Also, on Curaçao itself was blackwood, a raw material for natural paint, cattle, lime and fuel.

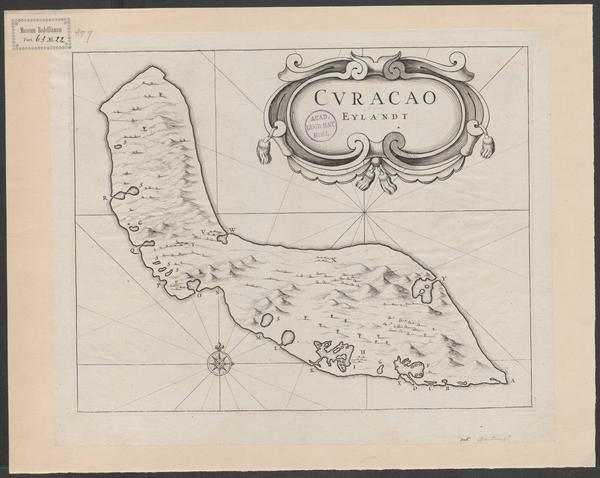
Map Curaçao eylandt

The fleet WIC under Admiral Johann van Walbeeck invaded the island in 1634 and the Spaniards on the island surrendered in San Juan in August. The approximately thirty Spaniards and a large part of the Taíno were deported to Santa Ana de Coro in Venezuela. About thirty Taíno families were allowed to live on the island.

After the conquest, Van Walbeeck ordered the construction of the fort Amsterdam at the mouth of the Sint Anna Bay. Dutch soldiers and slaves from Angola built the fort, which became the headquarters of the WIC from the outset. The WIC consolidated its claims by building other fortifications. Because drinking water was vital, in 1634-35 a fort was built near the water source on the northeast side of Sint Anna Bay. This fort consisted of earthen walls with a palisade and several pieces of artillery. In 1635-36 the construction of Fort Amsterdam was started on Punda, on the east side of the channel. The first building phase was built under the guidance of Admiral van Walbeeck in the form of a five-pointed star and consisted of a core of earth and coral. Against this a shell was built of clay-masoned coral. Later this shell was built from masonry.

In the first three years, the living conditions for the WIC troops were poor. For food and building materials, people were largely dependent on imports from Europe. The supply was very irregular, and more than half a year could pass without supply. As a result, a lot of stray cattle were caught and slaughtered. Other food was rationed. Water had to be brought to the Punda from the source. Soldiers and superiors slept in tents. Some of the soldiers were dissatisfied due to harsh housing conditions, poor food supplies and hard work, but mainly due to monotony and boredom. There seemed to be mutiny, but this was averted by raising the rations and offering liquor. Van Walbeek wrote to the Nineteen Gentlemen of the WIC, in which he recommended to raise salaries and rations, because the soldiers had not been hired to build fortifications.

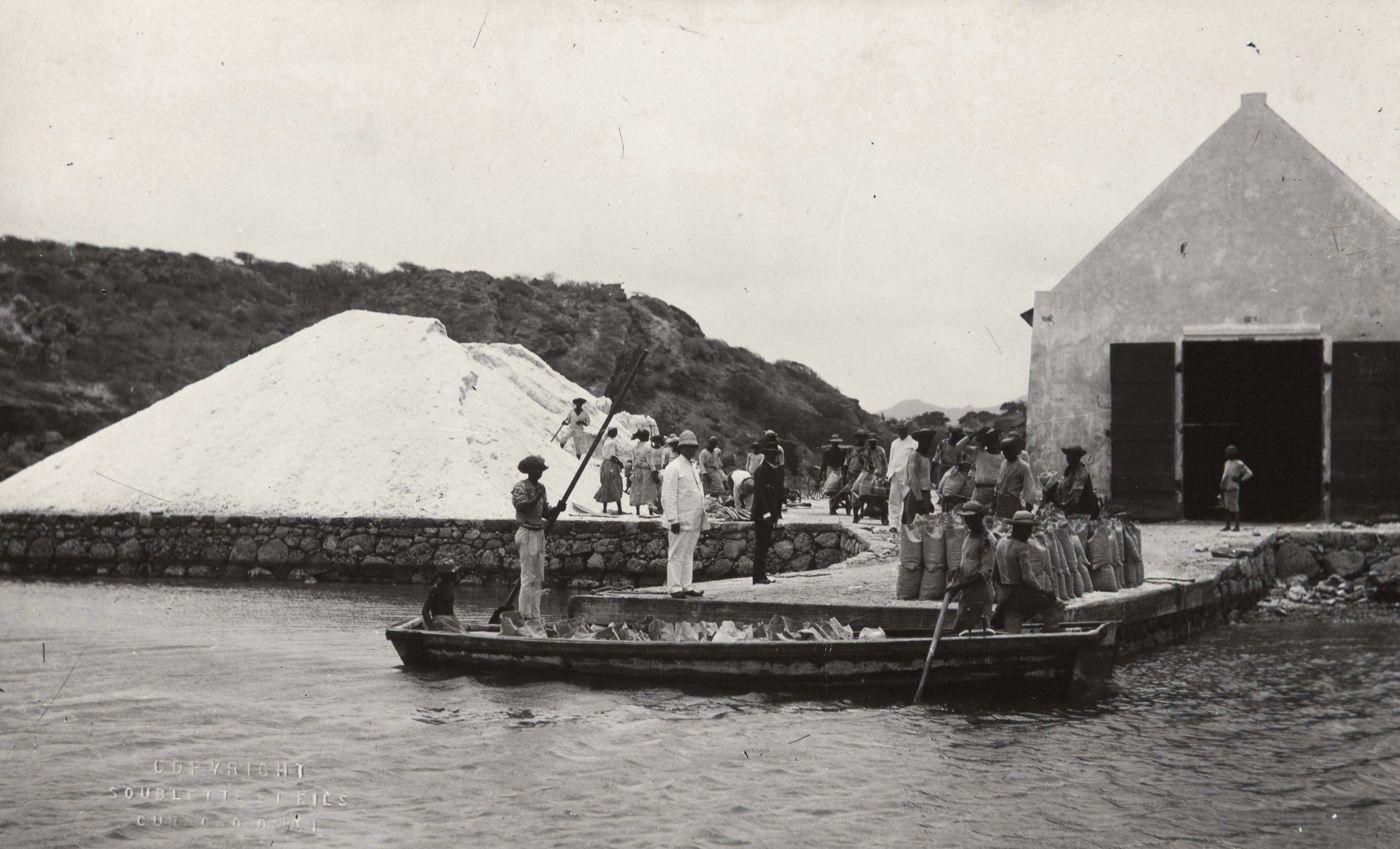
Salt collection in Curacao

The town of Willemstad started to grow out of Fort Amsterdam.

=== Dutch consolidation ===
The Spaniards schemed to recapture Curaçao from the Dutch. Information about troops, fortifications, outposts, food supplies and ammunition was collected in three ways. Indians who lived in Curaçao were kidnapped and interrogated. WIC personnel who came to fetch salt on the coast of Venezuela were captured and interrogated. Finally, Spaniards sent spies to Curaçao. The Spaniards attempted an invasion in 1637 with a number of ships and enough troops to overcome the WIC garrison. A storm forced them to turn away and they never reached Curaçao.

The Nineteen Gentlemen of the WIC in Amsterdam were divided over the future of Curaçao. The fortifications and men had cost a lot of money and the revenues were meager. Nevertheless, Curaçao was developed, presumably more a consequence of indecision than of a reasoned decision. Over time, Curaçao proved its value for the WIC. After the loss of Dutch Brazil in 1654, Curaçao became increasingly important. The favorable geographical position made it possible to trade with Europe, Venezuela, and other Caribbean islands. They also maintained contacts with Dutch colonies in North America, including New Netherland.

Peter Stuyvesant became acting governor in 1642, and held the position until 1644.

The Curaçao population grew steadily, partly due to the arrival of Sephardic Jews from former Dutch Brazil. The WIC also opened Curaçao for farming by new settlers from Europe. Even soldiers who had finished their time were welcome to stay. Naturally, the goal was to produce enough food for the Curaçao population. In addition, the WIC also wanted farmers to grow commercial crops. These included indigo, cotton, tobacco, Turkish wheat or sorgo and sugar cane. The first plantations were built from around 1650. They include locations in Hato, Savonet, St. Barbara, Santa Maria, Groot Piscadera, Groot and Klein Sint Joris, and San Juan. Some of the plantations remained in possession of the WIC. This led to a massive influx of slaves.

==== Jews ====
The Sephardic Jews who arrived from the Netherlands and then-Dutch Brazil since the 17th century have had a significant influence on the culture and economy of the island. Curaçao is home to the oldest active Jewish congregation in the Americas, dating to 1651. The Jewish Community of Curaçao also played a key role in supporting early Jewish congregations in New Amsterdam (present-day New York City), Cayenne and Coro in the 18th and 19th centuries. In the years before and after World War II there was an influx of Ashkenazi Jews from Eastern Europe, many of whom were Romanian Jews.

=== Slave trading and free port ===
For much of the 17th and 18th centuries, the primary business of the island was the slave trade. Enslaved people arrived often from Africa and were bought and sold on the docks in Willemstad before continuing on to their ultimate destination. Between 1662 and 1669, Domingo Grillo and Ambrosio Lomelín shipped 24,000 enslaved people, assisted by the Dutch West India Company and the Royal African Company from Jamaica.

The WIC supplied enslaved people at very competitive prices and thus drove most English, French and Portuguese traders out of the market. Enslaved people were bought by traders and then shipped to various destinations in Central America and South America. A relatively small proportion of the arriving Africans stayed on Curaçao.

The enslaved people that remained on the island were responsible for working the plantations established earlier. This influx of inexpensive manpower made the labor-intensive agricultural sector far more profitable and between the Netherlands and China the trading done on the docks and the work being done in the fields, the economic profile of Curaçao began to climb, this time built on the backs of the enslaved people.

The WIC made Curaçao a free port in 1674, giving it a key position in international trade networks. Partly because of this, it became one of the most prosperous islands in the Caribbean in the 17th century. This strained relations with other powers, especially England and France. As a result, in 1713 Curaçao was briefly besieged by the French captain Jacques Cassard, who finally allowed himself to be bought off. The siege had caused harm to the inhabitants of the island. Extensively specified lists of the damage suffered have been preserved in the OAC in the National Archives of The Hague. In 1716 a small slave revolt broke out, but the insurgents were arrested. Ten rebels, including Maria, were sentenced to death.

In the 18th century Curaçao tried to consolidate its trading position. However, trade in Venezuela and other Spanish colonies was prevented by the Spanish Coast Guard. The latter was specifically appointed to stop the illegal trade from Venezuela in tobacco and cocoa. The English and French became stronger and stronger in the Caribbean. These factors contributed to Curaçao's relative decline in importance. It was also important that Curaçao was not suitable for the large-scale cultivation of sugar cane, cotton, tobacco or other tropical plantation crops. Attempts to do so were halted at the end of the 17th and beginning of the 18th century. Curaçao's agriculture focused on providing food for its own population. Nevertheless, part of the food had to be imported. The slave trade remained the most important source of income for the Dutch, not least because of the competitive prices of the enslaved people.

=== Dutch colony ===
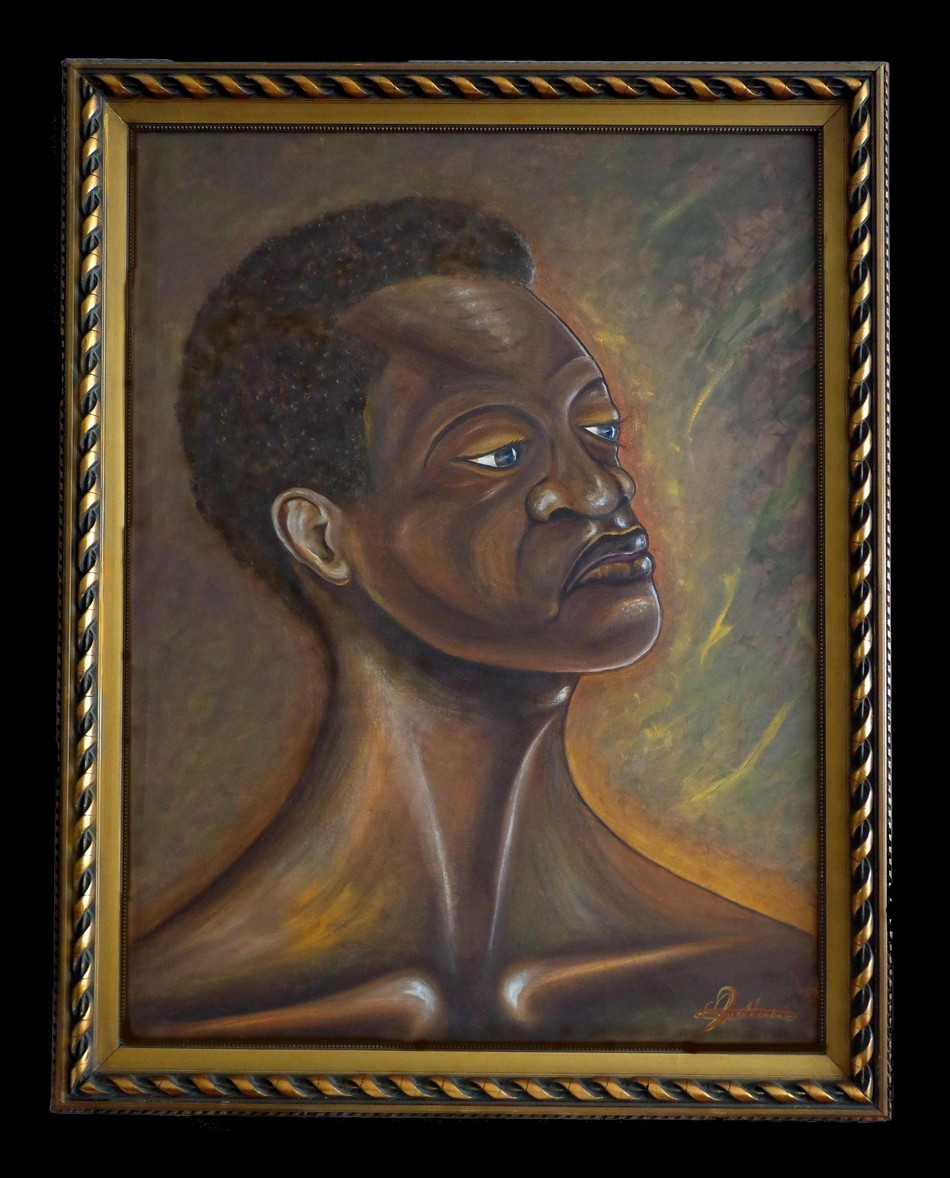
Modern artist interpretation of Tula, by Edsel Selberie

After the bankruptcy of the WIC in 1791, Curaçao became an actual Dutch colony. The Dutch were able to suppress the slave revolt of 1795. The uprising was led by Tula, a slave who plays a central role in the history of Curaçao.

On 18 January 1795, William V, Prince of Orange fled from the Netherlands, and went into exile in Great-Britain shortly before the announcement of the Batavian Republic. Governor Johannes de Veer refused to submit to the Batavian Republic, and was replaced by Jan Jacob Beaujon in August 1796. Beaujon was suspected of being an orangist and pro-British. The schutterij (militia) led by Johann Lauffer and aided by French troops from Guadeloupe committed a coup d'état, and on 1 December, Lauffer was installed as Governor of Curaçao and Dependencies.

The British captured Curaçao in 1800 and held it until 1803. They attacked again in 1804, and then held it from 1807 to 1816, after which they handed it back to the Dutch under the terms of the Treaty of Paris.

Curaçao's proximity to Venezuela resulted in interaction with cultures of the coastal areas. For instance, architectural similarities can be seen between the 19th-century parts of Willemstad and the nearby Venezuelan city of Coro in Falcón State. In the 19th century, Curaçaoans such as Manuel Piar and Luis Brión were prominently engaged in the wars of independence of Venezuela and Colombia. Political refugees from the mainland (such as Simon Bolivar) regrouped in Curaçao. Children from affluent Venezuelan families were educated on the island.. By 1823 a severe economic depression aggravated by a smallpox epidemic that broke out in 1827 led a significant number of Jews to leave the island and move to Venezuela and Colombia.

In order to reduce the administrative costs, the West Indies colonies were reduced in 1828 to one colony with a Governor-General in Paramaribo. In 1845 they partly returned to this because the administration of the islands from Suriname did not work well. From that year on there were again two West Indian colonies: Suriname, and Curaçao and Dependencies, both the Windward and Leeward Islands.

== Modern history ==
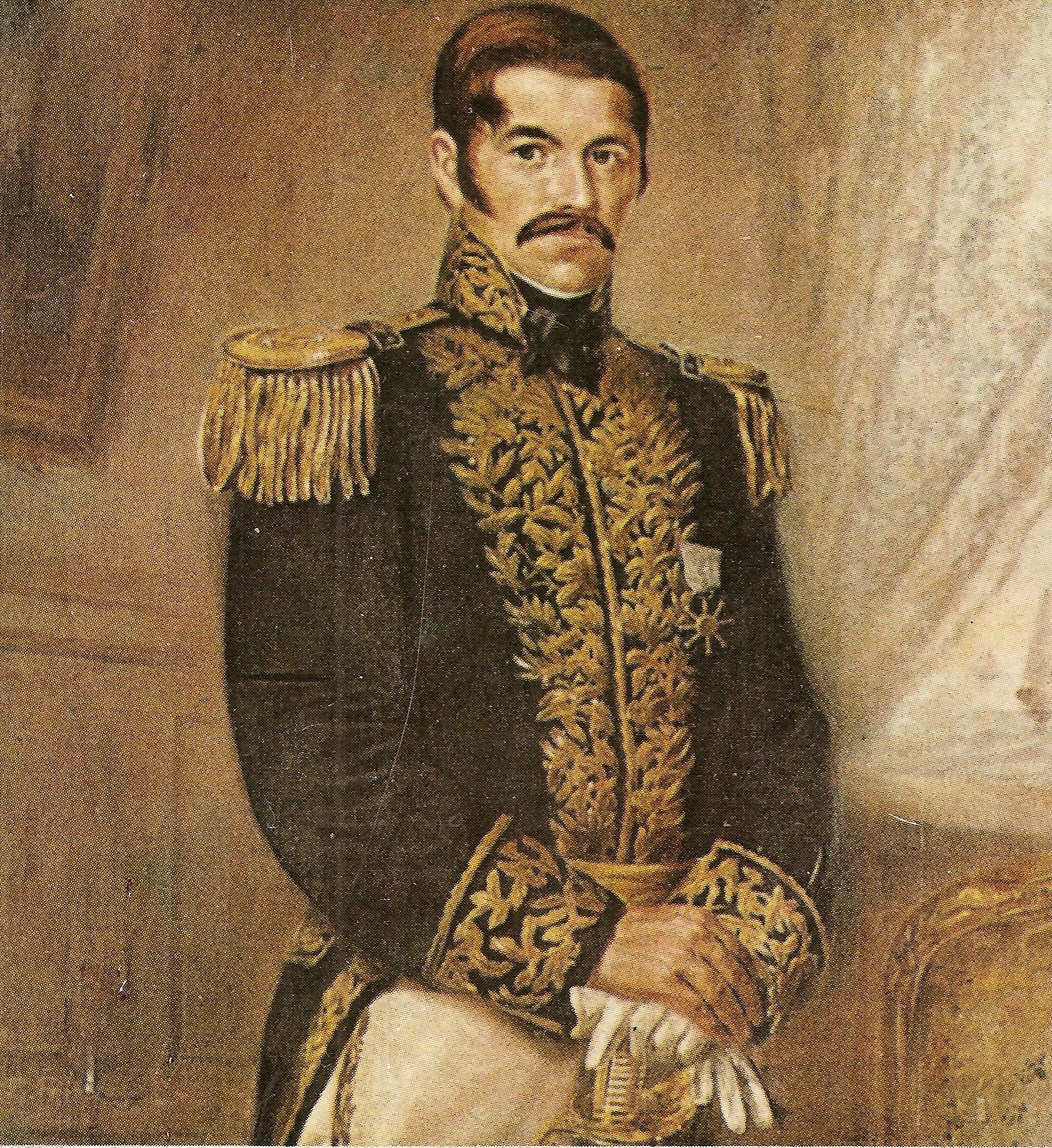
Luis Brión, a Curaçao-born Venezuelan admiral

The destabilization of the region produced by the Napoleonic Wars in Europe and the Imperialistic advances on the part of the British caused Cuarazo to change hands various times, beginning in the 19th century. The island was invaded by the English on two occasions, which were between 1800 and 1803, and between 1807 and 1816. Almost simultaneously, many independence movements of the Hispanic colonies of the continent occurred, with the contributions from Anglophile refugees like Simón Bólivar, and with the participation of at least two more important people, Manuel Piar, the leader of the rebels of the province of Guayana, and Luis Brión, who would become admiral of the Colombian Navy. In 1815, after the defeat of Napoleon at Waterloo, the Treaty of Paris granted legal sovereignty of the island to the Dutch

Following the example of England (1834) and France (1848), the Dutch abolished slavery in 1863, bringing a change in the economy with the shift to wage labour. The Dutch state compensated the slave owners with 200 guilders per slave for the loss of their property. Some inhabitants of Curaçao emigrated to other islands, such as Cuba, to work in sugar cane plantations. Other former slaves had nowhere to go and remained working for the plantation owner in the tenant farmer system. This was an instituted order in which the former slave leased land from his former master. In exchange the tenant promised to give up most of his harvest to the former slave master. This system lasted until the beginning of the 20th century.

Until the beginning of the twentieth century, Curaçao lived on trade, agriculture, and fishery. The economic tide turned in 1914 when large petroleum reserves were discovered in Venezuela. Shell immediately established an oil refinery on the island, Isla Refinery, near Asiento - where slaves were previously traded.

In the 1920s and early 1930s, Ashkenazi Jews from Eastern Europe immigrated to Curaçao. Though most initially had to work as peddlers, they were gradually able to get ahead and many went onto attain great prosperity. They kept their Jewish identity and formed a close-knit and isolated group. In the 1980s and 1990s the group's size diminished dramatically. Most of the first settlers died of old age and, because of political insecurity and economic decline, many Ashkenazi Jews left the island in the 1980s to settle elsewhere, especially in the United States and Israel.

On 8 June 1929 Fort Amsterdam was raided and captured by Venezuelan rebel Rafael Simón Urbina together with 250 others. They plundered weapons, ammunition and the treasury of the island. They also managed to capture the Governor of the island, Leonardus Albertus Fruytier, and hauled him off to Venezuela on the stolen American ship Maracaibo.

Following the raid the Dutch government decided to permanently station marines and ships on the island.

During the Second World War, the island played an important role in the supply of fuel for the Allied forces. In 1940, before the invasion of the Netherlands by Nazi Germany, the British occupied Curaçao and the French Aruba. The presence of powers other than the Netherlands alarmed the Venezuelan government given the proximity of these islands at the entrance to the Gulf of Venezuela and the fact they'd historically been used as bases to launch incursions against Venezuelan territory. In 1941, US troops occupied the island and built military airports in Aruba ("Dakota") and Curaçao ("Hato"). The main purpose was this deployment was to fight against expected future attacks by Axis submarines and potentially long-distance Nazi bombers. America was also concerned over the potential threat of a German invasion of the continental US launched with the aid of German settlers in South America.

In 1942 the port of the island, one of the main sources of fuel for the Allied operations, was besieged by German submarines on several occasions under Neuland Operation. In August 1942, the Germans returned to Curaçao and attacked a tanker and received fire from a Dutch shore battery before slipping away. The US Navy established the Fourth Fleet, which was responsible for countering enemy naval operations in the Caribbean and in the South Atlantic. The US Army also sent aircraft and personnel to help protect the oil refineries and bolster the Venezuelan Air Force.

In 1954, Curaçao, together with the other Netherlands Antilles, gained political autonomy.

=== Workers' revolt of 1969 ===
In the 1940s and 1950s the refinery brought prosperity and modernisation to the island, but prosperity was unevenly distributed. The newly created Curaçao working class became increasingly dissatisfied with the pay practices of the Royal Shell. The participation of the Afro-Curaçaoan population in the political process was also limited. On 30 May 1969, a workers' revolt (known as Trinta di mei in Papiamentu) broke out at the entrance gate to the Shell refinery. During the advance to the inner city, the trade union leader Wilson Godett (among others) was shot by police, and angry workers set fire to properties in Punda and Otrobanda.

After the local government had allowed Dutch marines to fly over to restore order, a lot of work was done to make the government more representative of the population. Wilson Goddett even held an administrative position for some time.

In the eighties, Shell left Curaçao. From then on, the island territory leased the oil refinery to the Venezuelan state oil company, the PDVSA. The oil refinery almost permanently causes serious air pollution on a strip of the island southwest of the refinery. There is growing resistance to this. This is called "the shame of Shell" on Curaçao.

=== Autonomous status ===
Curaçao was given an autonomous status similar to Aruba on October 10, 2010.

Unlike the Netherlands, the island is not part of the territory of the European Union and for that reason Curaçao, like Aruba and Sint Maarten, does not have to comply with European law or introduce the euro as a legal tender. Due to the special relationship with the Netherlands as an overseas territory (OCT, Landen en gebieden overzee or LGA in Dutch), the islands do qualify for European funds and EU wide cooperation agreements such as the Erasmus+ program. Furthermore, the inhabitants of the Caribbean part of the Kingdom of the Netherlands possess not only the Dutch nationality, but also European citizenship.

== See also ==
- Canon of Curaçao
