= Gilmar Pisas =

Curaçaoan politician (born 1971)

His Excellency Gilmar Pisas
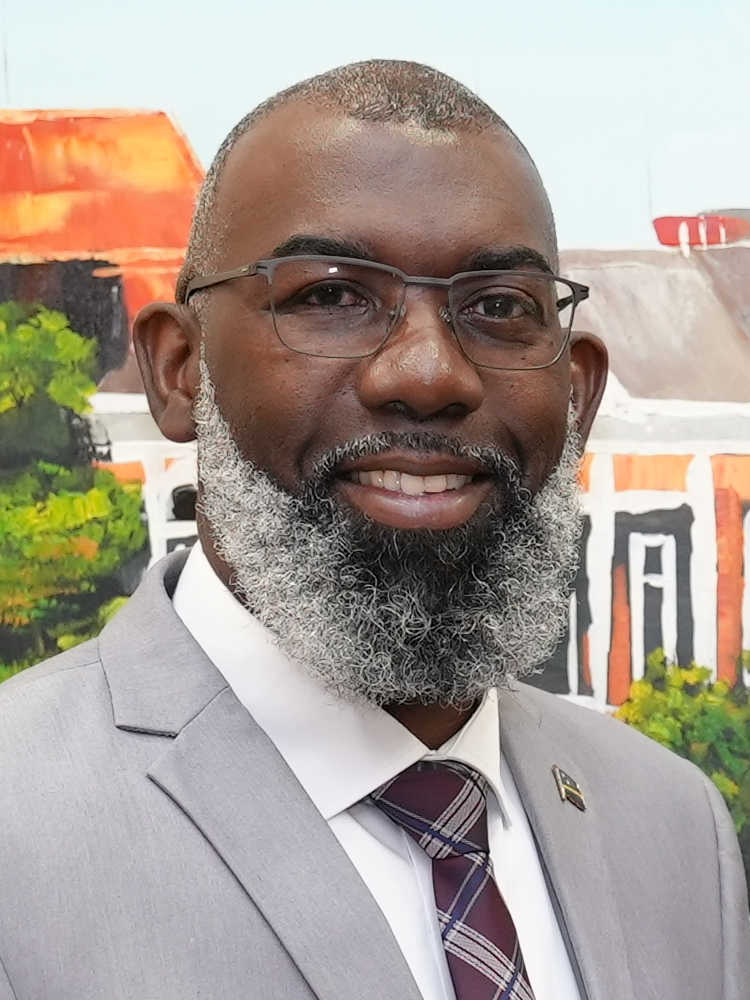
- Pisas in 2022

7th & 9th Prime Minister of Curaçao
- Incumbent
- Assumed office 14 June 2021
- Monarch: Willem-Alexander
- Governor: Lucille George-Wout; Mauritsz de Kort
- Preceded by: Eugene Rhuggenaath
- In office 24 March 2017 – 29 May 2017
- Monarch: Willem-Alexander
- Governor: Lucille George-Wout
- Preceded by: Hensley Koeiman
- Succeeded by: Eugene Rhuggenaath

Minister of Justice
- In office 24 March 2017 – 29 May 2017
- Prime Minister: himself
- Preceded by: Ornelia Martina

Speaker of Parliament
- In office 17 February 2017 – 24 March 2017
- Preceded by: Giselle McWilliam
- Succeeded by: Amerigo Thodé

Personal details
- Born: 28 October 1971 (age 54)
- Party: Movement for the Future of Curaçao

Gilmar Simon Pisas (born 28 October 1971) is a Curaçaoan politician and the Prime Minister of Curaçao, serving since 14 June 2021. He previously served as Prime Minister between 24 March 2017 and 29 May 2017, and as a member of the Parliament of Curaçao until June 2021.

== Early life and career ==
Pisas was born on 28 October 1971. Before becoming involved in politics, he worked as a police officer.

== Political career ==
Pisas was elected into the Parliament of Curaçao in the 2016 election. On 17 February 2017, Pisas was elected Speaker of Parliament, succeeding Giselle McWilliam.

=== First Pisas cabinet ===
On 24 March 2017, Pisas was sworn in as Prime Minister by Governor Lucille George-Wout, succeeding Hensley Koeiman. His interim cabinet received support by 12 of the 21 MPs. It included those belonging to the MFK, Korsou di Nos Tur, Movementu Progresivo, Sovereign People and the independent MPs Gassan Dannawi and Eduard Braam. Pisas was positioned as interim Prime Minister, pending the screening of Charles Cooper. Pisas was succeeded as Speaker of Parliament by Amerigo Thodé.

| Ministry | Minister | Period | Party |
|---|---|---|---|
| Prime Minister | Gilmar Pisas | 24 March 2017 – 29 May 2017 | Movement for the Future of Curaçao (MFK) |
| Minister for Education, Science, Culture and Sport | Maureena Esprit-Maduro | 24 March 2017 – 29 May 2017 | Independent, representative for Gassan Dannawi |
| Minister for Social Development, Work and Welfare | Jaime Córdoba | 24 March 2017 – 29 May 2017 | Sovereign People |
| Minister for Justice | Gilmar Pisas | 24 March 2017 – 29 May 2017 | Movement for the Future of Curaçao (MFK) |
| Minister for Governance, Planning and Service | Norberto Vieira Ribeiro | 24 March 2017 – 29 May 2017 | Korsou di Nos Tur |
| Minister for Finance | Lourdes Alberto | 24 March 2017 – 29 May 2017 | Independent, representative for Eduard Braam |
| Minister for Traffic, Transport and Urban Planning | Ruthmilda Larmonie-Cecilia | 24 March 2017 – 30 March 2017 | Sovereign People |
| Minister for Economic Development | Errol Goeloe | 24 March 2017 – 29 May 2017 | Korsou di Nos Tur |
| Minister for Health, Environment and Nature | Sisline Girigoria | 24 March 2017 – 29 May 2017 | Movementu Progresivo |

=== Re-election as Member of Parliament ===
Pisas was re-elected as MP in the 2017 election. On 6 June 2020, he was elected as the leader of the Movement for the Future of Curaçao (MFK). Being the leader of the largest opposition party in parliament, Pisas demanded the resignation of the Rhuggenaath cabinet in July 2020, stating that it was not supported by a parliamentary majority. In September 2020, in response to the need for Dutch financial support related to the COVID-19 pandemic in Curaçao, Pisas showed some support for a Caribbean Reform Entity (Dutch: Caribische Hervormingsentiteit (CHE)), but stated that proposed term of the CHE was too extensive.

=== Second Pisas cabinet ===
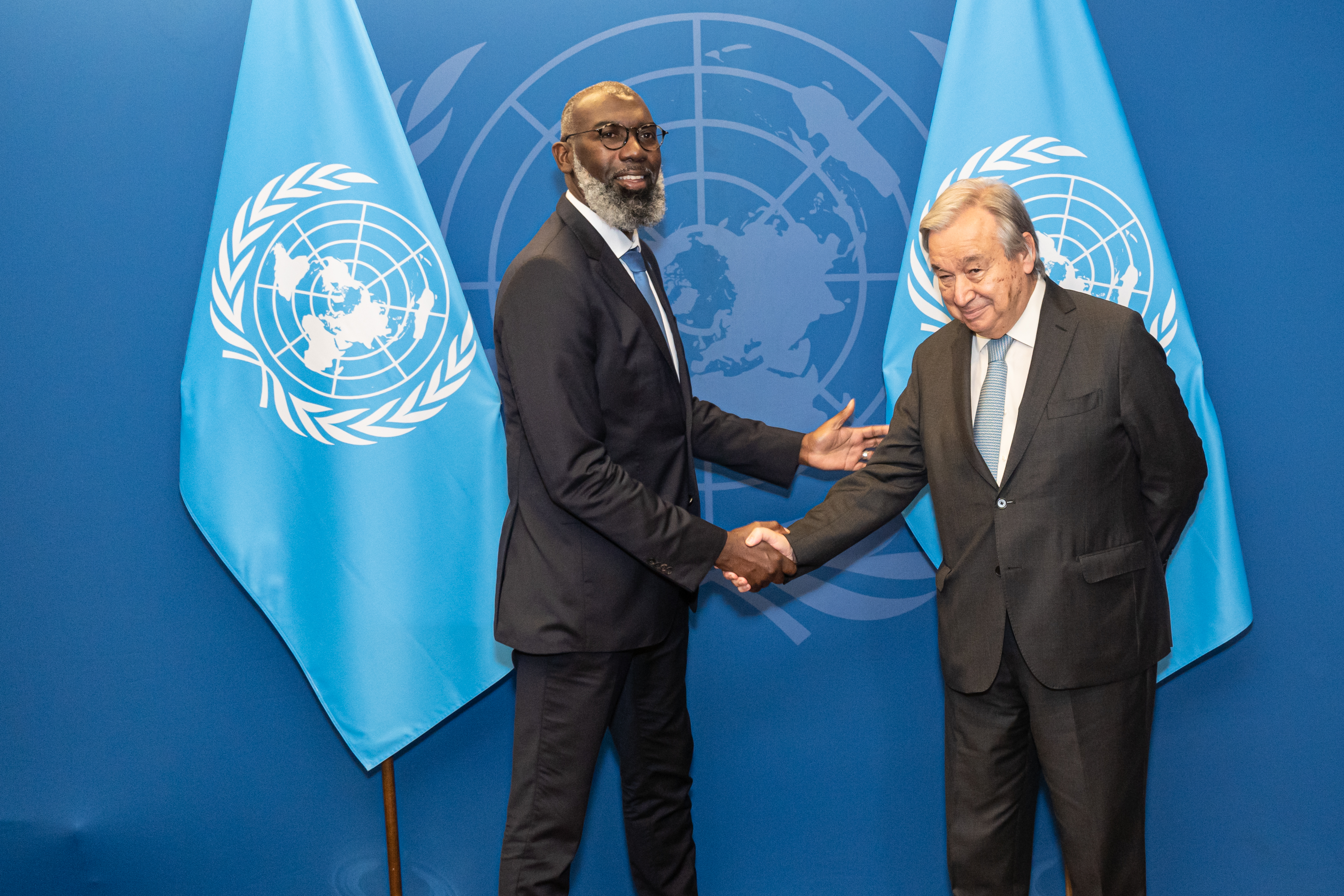
Pisas meeting with UN Secretary-General António Guterres in 2022

Following the 2021 election, the second Pisas cabinet was sworn in on 14 June 2021 by the Governor of Curaçao as successor to the Rhuggenaath cabinet. It is a coalition government of the parties Movement for the Future of Curaçao (MFK) and National People's Party (PNP).

| Ministry | Minister | Period | Party |
|---|---|---|---|
| Prime Minister | Gilmar Pisas | 14 June 2021 – Incumbent | Movement for the Future of Curaçao (MFK) |
| Minister for Education, Science, Culture and Sport | Sithrey van Heydoorn | 14 June 2021 – Incumbent | Movement for the Future of Curaçao (MFK) |
| Minister for Social Development, Work and Welfare | Ruthmilda Larmonie-Cecilia | 14 June 2021 – Incumbent | National People's Party (PNP) |
| Minister for Justice | Gilmar Pisas | 14 June 2021 – Incumbent | Movement for the Future of Curaçao (MFK) |
| Minister for Governance, Planning and Service | Ornelio Kid Martina | 14 June 2021 – Incumbent | National People's Party (PNP) |
| Minister for Finance | Javier Silvania | 14 June 2021 – Incumbent | Movement for the Future of Curaçao (MFK) |
| Minister for Traffic, Transport and Urban Planning | Charles Cooper | 14 June 2021 – Incumbent | Movement for the Future of Curaçao (MFK) |
| Minister for Economic Development | Ruisandro Cijntje | 14 June 2021 – Incumbent | National People's Party (PNP) |
| Minister for Health, Environment and Nature | Dorothy Janga | 14 June 2021 – Incumbent | Movement for the Future of Curaçao (MFK) |

== Controversies ==
Shortly after the formation of the Pisas cabinet, Pisas appealed to the governor that the planned 28 April elections should be cancelled. Pisas stated that a new majority had been formed in Parliament and that there was thus no need for new elections. a majority in parliament appealed to the European Court of Human Rights (ECHR) to allow the election to be cancelled. The petition to the ECHR was dismissed by the court on 29 March. the ECHR rejected the petition.

A resolution was passed in Parliament on 27 March, calling for the cancelling or postponing of the elections. Governor George-Wout refused to sign the resolution, cited it "seriously impaired legal certainty and good governance". The Council of Ministers of the Kingdom of the Netherlands proposed, by use of an Algemene maatregel van rijksbestuur, to task Governor George-Wout with responsibility for holding the elections. Minister of Interior and Kingdom Relations Ronald Plasterk stated that the "interim cabinet severely damaged the integrity of the electoral process" and asked the Council of State for an urgent advice. On 3 April the Council of State gave a positive advice for the proposed measures. The proposed measures were formally taken by the Council of Ministers of the Kingdom of the Netherlands the same day. In response to the actions by the Council of Ministers Pisas stated: "the Netherlands is biased" and that the Netherlands was behind the parties opposing his coalition. He regretted the decision by the Council and called it unnecessary.

On 28 April, Pisas submitted the resignation of his cabinet to the Governor. On 29 May the Pisas cabinet was succeeded by that of Eugene Rhuggenaath.

Political offices
| Preceded by Hensley Koeiman | Prime Minister of Curaçao; March 2017 – May 2017 | Succeeded by Eugene Rhuggenaath |
