= Eugene Rhuggenaath =

7th prime minister of Curaçao

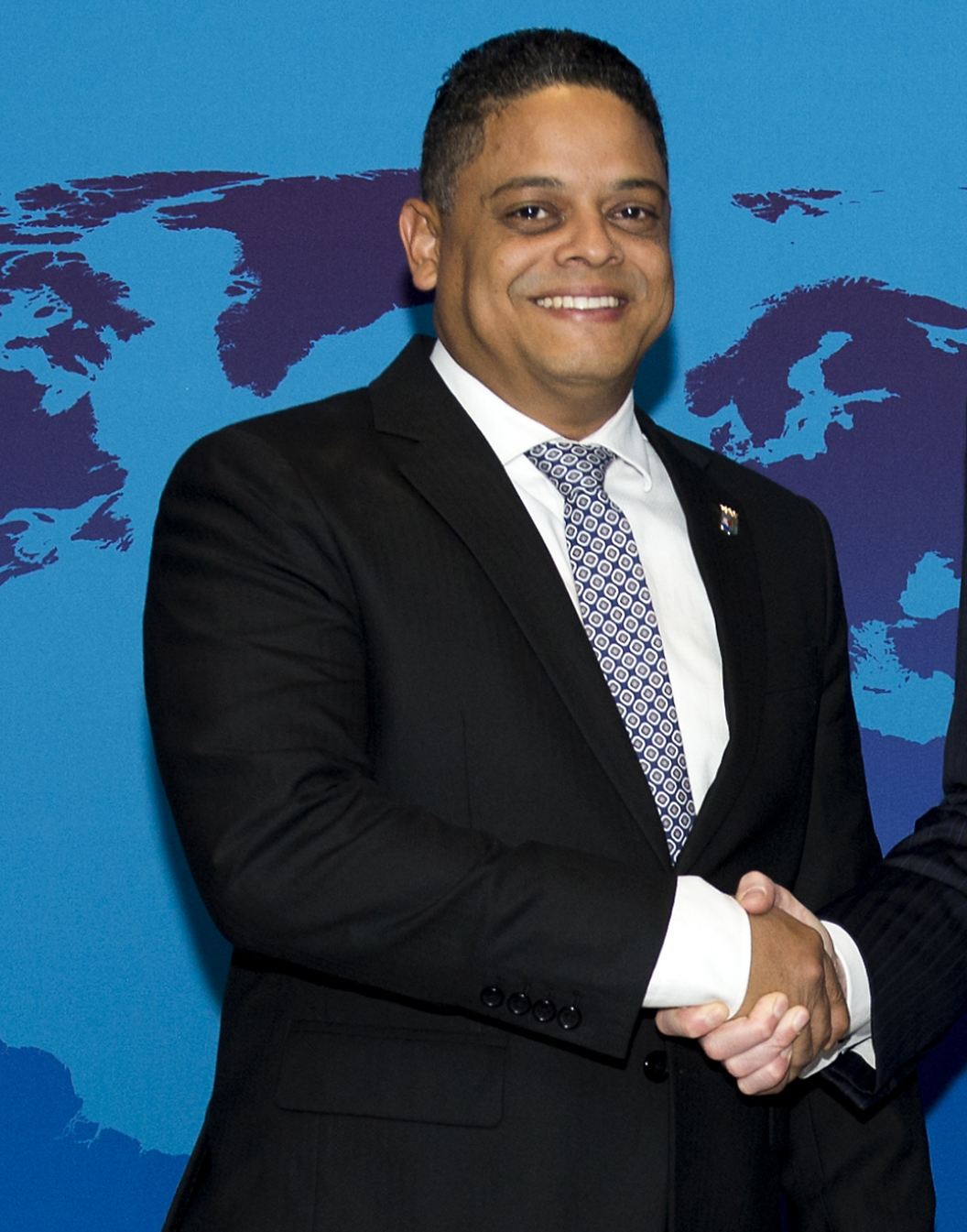

8th Prime Minister of Curaçao
- In office 29 May 2017 – 14 June 2021
- Monarch: Willem-Alexander
- Governor: Lucille George-Wout
- Preceded by: Gilmar Pisas
- Succeeded by: Gilmar Pisas

Minister for Economic Development
- In office 30 November 2015 – 24 March 2017
- Prime Minister: Ben Whiteman; Hensley Koeiman
- Preceded by: Stanley Palm
- Succeeded by: Errol Goeloe

Member of Parliament
- In office 11 May 2017 – 14 June 2021

Member of the Island council of Curaçao
- In office 2003–2009

Personal details
- Born: 4 February 1970 (age 56) Curaçao, Netherlands Antilles
- Party: Partido Alternativa Real (Real Alternative Party, PAR)

Eugene Rhuggenaath (born 4 February 1970) is a Curaçaoan politician who served as the eighth prime minister of Curaçao between 29 May 2017 and 14 June 2021. He previously served as the minister for Economic Development in the Koeiman-Cabinet in 2016. He served as a member of the Island Council (2003–2009) and a member of parliament till 2021.

== Early life and education ==
Rhuggenaath graduated with a Master of Business Administration from Rotterdam School of Management, Erasmus University in 1998, and with a Bachelor of Business Administration degree from the University of Miami.

== Career ==
Rhuggenaath served as Minister of Economic Development from 2015 to 2017, and was Minister of Education, Culture, and Sports in 2020.

== Premiership ==
During the 2017 Curaçao general election his party received the most votes. Rhuggenaath was appointed formateur by the governor to form a coalition government.

Rhuggenaath was sworn in as prime minister on 29 May 2017.

On 29 September 2017 Rhuggenaath held a speech calling for more acceptance at the Curaçao Gay Pride, activists called the speech "historical".

The two governments reached an agreement in October 2020 that gave Curaçao more autonomy and power over COVID-19 investments and loans.

Rhuggenaath was elected for parliament in the 2021 Curaçao general election, but relinquished his seat.

== Later life ==
Rhuggenaath became chair of the Supervisory Board of the Caribbean Netherlands Pension Fund in 2023. He was selected to replace Koen Davidse as an executive director of the World Bank Group and assumed the office on 1 November 2023.

Political offices
Preceded by Gilmar Pisas	Prime Minister of Curaçao; 2017–2021	Succeeded by Gilmar Pisas
