= Prime Minister of Curaçao =

Head of government in the Kingdom of the Netherlands

The Prime Minister of Curaçao is the head of government of Curaçao. The post was created after the Netherlands Antilles had been dissolved on 10 October 2010 and Curaçao became a country within the Kingdom of the Netherlands. The Prime Minister, together with his Council of Ministers and the Governor of Curaçao form the executive branch of the government of Curaçao.

== Cabinet Schotte ==
Curaçao's first Prime Minister was Gerrit Schotte. His government stepped down upon losing a majority in the Estates of Curaçao, the unicameral legislature and continued to operate in a demissionary capacity, responsible for current affairs and called elections. The majority of the estates however demanded that he should be removed from his office before the elections. The motions to that effect were passed outside normal parliamentary procedure, as the president of the Estates did convene the estates before the elections.

== List of prime ministers of Curaçao ==
No.	Prime Minister (lifespan)		Term of office			Party	Election	Cabinet (composition)	Governor (term)	Monarch (reign)
No.	Prime Minister (lifespan)		Took office	Left office	Length	Party	Election	Cabinet (composition)	Governor (term)	Monarch (reign)
1	Portrait of Gerrit Schotte	Gerrit Schotte (born 1974)	10 October 2010	29 September 2012	1 year, 355 days	Movement for the Future of Curaçao (MFK)	2010	Schotte (MFK – PS – MAN)	Frits Goedgedrag (2010–2012)	Beatrix r. 1980–2013
2		Stanley Betrian (born 1951)	29 September 2012	31 December 2012	93 days	Independent	2012	Betrian (Ind.)	Frits Goedgedrag (2010–2012)	Beatrix r. 1980–2013
3		Daniel Hodge (born 1959)	31 December 2012	7 June 2013	158 days	Independent	—	Hodge (Ind.)	Adèle van der Pluijm-Vrede (2012–2013); Acting	Beatrix r. 1980–2013
4	Portrait of Ivar Asjes	Ivar Asjes (born 1970)	7 June 2013	31 August 2015	2 years, 85 days	Pueblo Soberano (PS)	—	Asjes (PS – PAIS – PNP)	Lucille George-Wout (2013–2025)	Willem-Alexander r. 2013–present
5	Portrait of Ben Whiteman	Ben Whiteman (born 1954)	31 August 2015	23 December 2016	1 year, 114 days	Pueblo Soberano (PS)	—	Whiteman (PS – PAIS – PNP – PAR)	Lucille George-Wout (2013–2025)	Willem-Alexander r. 2013–present
6	Portrait of Hensley Koeiman	Hensley Koeiman (born 1956)	23 December 2016	24 March 2017	91 days	Partido MAN (MAN)	2016	Koeiman (MAN – PAR – PNP – PS)	Lucille George-Wout (2013–2025)	Willem-Alexander r. 2013–present
7	Portrait of Gilmar Pisas	Gilmar Pisas (born 1971); 1st time	24 March 2017	29 May 2017	66 days	Movement for the Future of Curaçao (MFK)	2017	Pisas I (MFK – PS – MP – Kòrsou di Nos Tur)	Lucille George-Wout (2013–2025)	Willem-Alexander r. 2013–present
8	Portrait of Eugene Rhuggenaath	Eugene Rhuggenaath (born 1970)	29 May 2017	14 June 2021	4 years, 16 days	Real Alternative Party (PAR)	—	Rhuggenaath (PAR – MAN – PIN)	Lucille George-Wout (2013–2025)	Willem-Alexander r. 2013–present
9	Portrait of Gilmar Pisas	Gilmar Pisas (born 1971); 2nd time	14 June 2021	9 June 2025	5 years, 61 days	Movement for the Future of Curaçao (MFK)	2021	Pisas II (MFK – PNP)	Lucille George-Wout (2013–2025)	Willem-Alexander r. 2013–present
9	Portrait of Gilmar Pisas	Gilmar Pisas (born 1971); 2nd time	9 June 2025	Incumbent	5 years, 61 days	Movement for the Future of Curaçao (MFK)	2025	Pisas III (MFK)	Mauritsz de Kort (2025–present)	Willem-Alexander r. 2013–present

== Timeline ==
This is a graphical lifespan timeline of prime ministers of Curaçao. They are listed in order of first assuming office.
