= Sovereign People =

Sovereign People Papiamentu: Pueblo Soberano Dutch: Souverein Volk
- Leader: Ben Whiteman (until June 2025)
- Chairperson: Siegfried Victorina; Donald Balentina
- Founder: Helmin Wiels
- Founded: 2005
- Ideology: Curaçao independence Left-wing nationalism Anti-corruption
- Political position: Left-wing
- Colours: Dark red, orange, cream
- Estates of Curaçao: 0 / 21

Sovereign People (Dutch: Souverein Volk, Papiamento: Pueblo Soberano) is a political party in Curaçao founded in 2005 by Helmin Wiels and Harold Willems. The party aims for complete independence of Curaçao outside the Kingdom of the Netherlands. In 2012 Wiels stated that Curaçao could become independent within 10 years.

In the Curaçao 2010 elections, Pueblo Sobrerano won four seats and became part of the governing coalition of the Cabinet Schotte on 10 October 2010. It became the largest party in the Estates of Curaçao after the Curaçao general election of 2012.

Pueblo Soberano was headed by Helmin Wiels until his murder in May 2013. On 14 December 2015, Jaime Córdoba was elected the new political leader of Pueblo Soberano and succeeded Helmin Wiels. He was the sole candidate in the party elections. Córdoba was succeeded by Ben Whiteman in October 2018. Whiteman laid down his position in June 2025 due to health reasons.

PS won two seats in the 2016 and 1 in the 2017 elections. After the 2021 elections the PS lost all seats.

The party opposes same-sex marriage.

== Election results ==
Curaçao island council elections
Year	Leader	Votes	%	Seats
2007	Helmin Wiels	5,494	7.38	1 / 21

Netherlands Antilles general elections
Year		Votes	Seats
2006	Helmin Wiels	3,360	0 / 14
2010	Helmin Wiels	10,789	2 / 14

Year	Leader	Votes	+/– votes	Seats	+/– seats	Government
2010	Helmin Wiels	13,886 (#3)		4 / 21	▲3	Coalition
2012	Helmin Wiels	19,715 (#1)	▲5,829	5 / 21	▲1	Coalition
2016	Jaime Córdoba	5,323 (#6)	▼14,392	2 / 21	▼3	Opposition
2017	Jaime Córdoba	4,029 (#6)	▼1,294	1 / 21	▼1	Opposition
2021	Ben Whiteman	1,215 (#15)	▼2,814	0 / 21	▼1	Extra-parliamentary

== Netherlands Antilles ==
The party participated in the Netherlands Antilles general elections as well as those of the Island council of Curaçao until the dissolution of the Netherlands Antilles. The party held two seats of the 14-seat Curaçao constituency in the 22-seat Estates of the Netherlands Antilles in 2010, (after obtaining no seats in 2006).

The party won a single seat at the island council elections in Curaçao in 2007. At the 2010 elections, the party obtained 3 seats in the Island council, which became the estates of Curaçao on 10 October 2010.
