= Elections in Curaçao =

Curaçao elects a legislature called the Estates of Curaçao (Staten). It consists of 21 members, elected for a four-year term by proportional representation. The first Estates of Curaçao were the succession of the Island council of Curaçao (a form of devolved government in the Netherlands Antilles), upon the dissolution of the Netherlands Antilles in 2010. In October 2012, elections were held for the Estates.

Prior to becoming a "land" (English: constituent country) within the Kingdom of the Netherlands on 10 October 2010, elections were held for the Island Council and of the Curaçao constituency of the Estates of the Netherlands Antilles.

In addition, Curaçao has held referendums in 1993, 2005 and 2009.

== Latest elections ==
The MFK, party of the incumbent Prime Minister Gilmar Pisas, won a landslide victory. With 55.2% of the votes, it would receive 13 of the 21 parliamentary seats. This election marked the first time a single party won an absolute majority in Curaçao's parliament. The PNP, coalition partner of the MFK, maintained its four seats. In opposition, the PAR had its parliamentary representation halved, retaining only two seats.

Party	Votes	%	Seats	+/–
Movement for the Future of Curaçao	41,638	55.22	13	+4
National People's Party	12,297	16.31	4	0
Real Alternative Party	7,561	10.03	2	–2
Partido MAN–Partido Inovashon Nashonal	6,378	8.46	2	0
Curaçao is the Best	2,526	3.35	0	–1
Movementu Kousa Promé	1,846	2.45	0	0
Work for Curaçao	1,616	2.14	0	–1
Mihó Kòrsou	1,540	2.04	0	New
Total	75,402	100.00	21	0
Valid votes	75,402	98.00		
Invalid votes	1,302	1.69		
Blank votes	233	0.30		
Total votes	76,937	100.00		
Registered voters/turnout	111,932	68.74		
Source: KSE

== 2021 elections ==
Party	Votes	%	Seats	+/–
Movement for the Future of Curaçao	23,554	27.76	9	+4
Real Alternative Party	11,781	13.89	4	–2
National People's Party	10,573	12.46	4	+4
Partido MAN	5,463	6.44	2	–3
Curaçao is the Best	4,542	5.35	1	New
Work for Curaçao	4,413	5.20	1	New
A Change for Curaçao	3,962	4.67	0	New
Partido Inovashon Nashonal	3,733	4.40	0	–1
Kòrsou Vishonario	3,541	4.17	0	New
Kòrsou di Nos Tur	3,521	4.15	0	–2
Movementu Kousa Promé	2,454	2.89	0	0
Democratic Party	2,391	2.82	0	0
Curaçao a New Dutch Municipality	2,241	2.64	0	New
Movementu Progresivo	1,461	1.72	0	–1
Sovereign People	1,216	1.43	0	–1
Total	84,846	100.00	21	0
Valid votes	84,846	98.68		
Invalid/blank votes	1,132	1.32		
Total votes	85,978	100.00		
Registered voters/turnout	116,146	74.03		
Source: KSE

== 2017 elections ==
Party	Votes	%	Seats	+/–
Real Alternative Party	18,368	23.30	6	+2
Partido MAN	16,070	20.39	5	+1
Movement for the Future of Curaçao	15,706	19.92	5	+1
Kòrsou di Nos Tur	7,439	9.44	2	−1
Partido Inovashon Nashonal	4,200	5.33	1	New
Sovereign People	4,028	5.11	1	−1
Movementu Progresivo	3,880	4.92	1	0
Un Kòrsou Hustu	3,206	4.07	0	−1
National People's Party	3,099	3.93	0	−2
Movementu Kousa Promé	1,975	2.51	0	0
Workers' Liberation Front–PAN	859	1.09	0	New
Total	78,830	100.00	21	0
Valid votes	78,830	98.58		
Invalid/blank votes	1,138	1.42		
Total votes	79,968	100.00		
Registered voters/turnout	120,430	66.40		
Source: KSE

== 2016 elections ==
Party	Votes	%	Seats	+/–
Partido MAN	12,839	16.23	4	+2
Movement for the Future of Curaçao	12,671	16.01	4	–1
Party for the Restructured Antilles	11,949	15.10	4	0
Kòrsou di Nos Tur	8,254	10.43	3	New
National People's Party	7,017	8.87	2	+1
Sovereign People	5,323	6.73	2	–3
Un Kòrsou Hustu	4,845	6.12	1	New
Movementu Progresivo	4,140	5.23	1	New
Partido pa Adelanto I Inovashon Soshal	3,654	4.62	0	–4
Movementu Patriótiko i Adelanto Sosial	3,452	4.36	0	New
Democratic Party	1,963	2.48	0	0
Movementu Kousa Promé	1,867	2.36	0	New
Pro Kòrsou	1,146	1.45	0	New
Total	79,120	100.00	21	0
Valid votes	79,120	98.38		
Invalid/blank votes	1,303	1.62		
Total votes	80,423	100.00		
Registered voters/turnout	120,456	66.77		
Source: KSE

== 2012 elections ==
Party	Votes	%	Seats	+/–
Sovereign People	19,715	22.67	5	+1
Movement for the Future of Curaçao	18,450	21.21	5	0
Party for the Restructured Antilles	17,179	19.75	4	–4
Partido pa Adelanto I Inovashon Soshal	15,286	17.58	4	+4
Partido MAN	8,294	9.54	2	0
National People's Party	5,130	5.90	1	0
Workers' Liberation Front	1,790	2.06	0	–1
Democratic Party–Labour	1,127	1.30	0	0
Total	86,971	100.00	21	0
Valid votes	86,971	97.79		
Invalid/blank votes	1,963	2.21		
Total votes	88,934	100.00		
Registered voters/turnout	116,857	76.10		
Source: KSE

== 2010 elections ==
Party	Votes	%	Seats	+/–
Party for the Restructured Antilles	22,474	30.23	8	+1
Movement for the Future of Curaçao	15,953	21.46	5	New
Sovereign People	13,886	18.68	4	+3
Partido MAN	6,531	8.79	2	–3
Workers' Liberation Front	4,813	6.47	1	–1
National People's Party	4,588	6.17	1	–1
Democratic Party	3,048	4.10	0	–1
Partido pa Adelanto I Inovashon Soshal	2,202	2.96	0	New
People's Crusade Labour Party	509	0.68	0	0
Lista Niun Paso Atras	336	0.45	0	–2
Total	74,340	100.00	21	0
Valid votes	74,340	98.37		
Invalid/blank votes	1,231	1.63		
Total votes	75,571	100.00		
Registered voters/turnout	114,828	65.81		
Source: KSE

== See also ==
- 2012 Curaçao general election
- Electoral calendar
- Electoral system
