= José Jardim =

Curaçaoan politician (born 1973)

Minister of Finance
- In office 29 September 2012 – 23 December 2016
- Prime Minister: Stanley Betrian; Daniel Hodge; Ivar Asjes; Ben Whiteman
- Preceded by: George Jamaloodin
- Succeeded by: Kenneth Gijsbertha

Personal details
- Born: 24 April 1973 (age 53) Curaçao
- Party: Independent
- Education: Technical University of Lisbon

José Manuel Norberto Jardim (born 24 April 1973) is a Curaçaoan politician, he was Minister of Finance from 31 December 2012 to 23 December 2016. Jardim has served under four out of six Prime Ministers of Curaçao. Before becoming Minister Jardim was secretary general of the Ministry of Finance between October 2010 and April 2012.

== Early life and career ==
Jardim was born on 24 April 1973 on Curaçao. He completed his vwo-education at the Radulphus College in 1991. He studied general economics and obtained a degree in 1996 and a further post-doc degree in 2007. In 2012 Jardim earned a PhD in Economics from the Instituto Superior de Economia e Gestão, at the Technical University of Lisbon. He wrote his thesis on the relationship between the restructuring of state finances and the informal economy.

After his initial studies Jardim worked for the Banco de Portugal and later the Directorate of Finances of the Netherlands Antilles. He held different functions there and eventually became director. After the dissolution of the Netherlands Antilles he became secretary general of the Ministry of Finance of Curaçao. As the Netherlands cleared most of the country's debt at independence the country started with a blank slate. George Jamaloodin became the Finance Minister in the cabinet of Gerrit Schotte and had to deal with issues as pensions, costs of healthcare and education and the number of civil servants which were a threat to the country's future financial position. In his capacity as secretary general Jardim advised Jamaloodin but felt that his advice was not heard. Jardim cited refusing to see that Curaçao was heading to bankruptcy as Jamaloodin's biggest flaw. Discontent with the approach to the finances of the country Jardim resigned as secretary general in April 2012.

== Political career ==
Shortly after his resignation, the Netherlands indicated to Curaçao that it needed to fix its budget for the coming year and the government of Schotte fell. Jardim was asked to join the cabinet of interim Prime Minister Stanley Betrian as Finance Minister, which he agreed to. The cabinet was sworn in on 29 September 2012.

On 31 December 2012 the cabinet of Daniel Hodge was installed, in which Jardim was the only minister to return from the Betrian cabinet. After the interim period of the Hodge cabinet Jardim continued in the same position in the cabinet of Ivar Asjes, and was sworn in on 7 June 2013.

After the one year mark of the Asjes cabinet several members of the Estates of Curaçao were in general unhappy with the results made, Eugène Cleopa of the majority Partido pa Adelanto I Inovashon Soshal and opposition member Armin Konket of the Party for the Restructured Antilles both praised Jardim for bringing the country's finances back on track. When Earl Balborda resigned as Minister of Traffic, Transport and Urban Planning in March 2015, Jardim took over his post in an interim capacity.

After Prime Minister Asjes resigned in August 2015 he was succeeded by Ben Whiteman, Jardim continued as Minister of Finance. He was reappointed in the second Whiteman cabinet on 30 November.

Jardim was Minister on the behalf of Glenn Sulvaran, an independent member of the Estates of Curaçao who formerly belonged to the Party for the Restructured Antilles.

Jardim was replaced by Kenneth Gijsbertha in the Hensley Koeiman cabinet which was installed on 23 December 2016.

== Policies ==
For the 2012–2013 period under the two interim-cabinets it was clear that the country's finances needed to be improved. Under Jardim the country raised the age of retirement from 60 to 65, raised pension premiums. An income-dependent healthcare premium was introduced. It furthermore saw a tax-increase on luxury and harmful goods. Apart from these measures Jardim intended to introduce stimuli to the economy.

In August 2015 a redesign of the sales tax was planned.
