= George Jamaloodin =

1st Minister of Finance of Curaçao

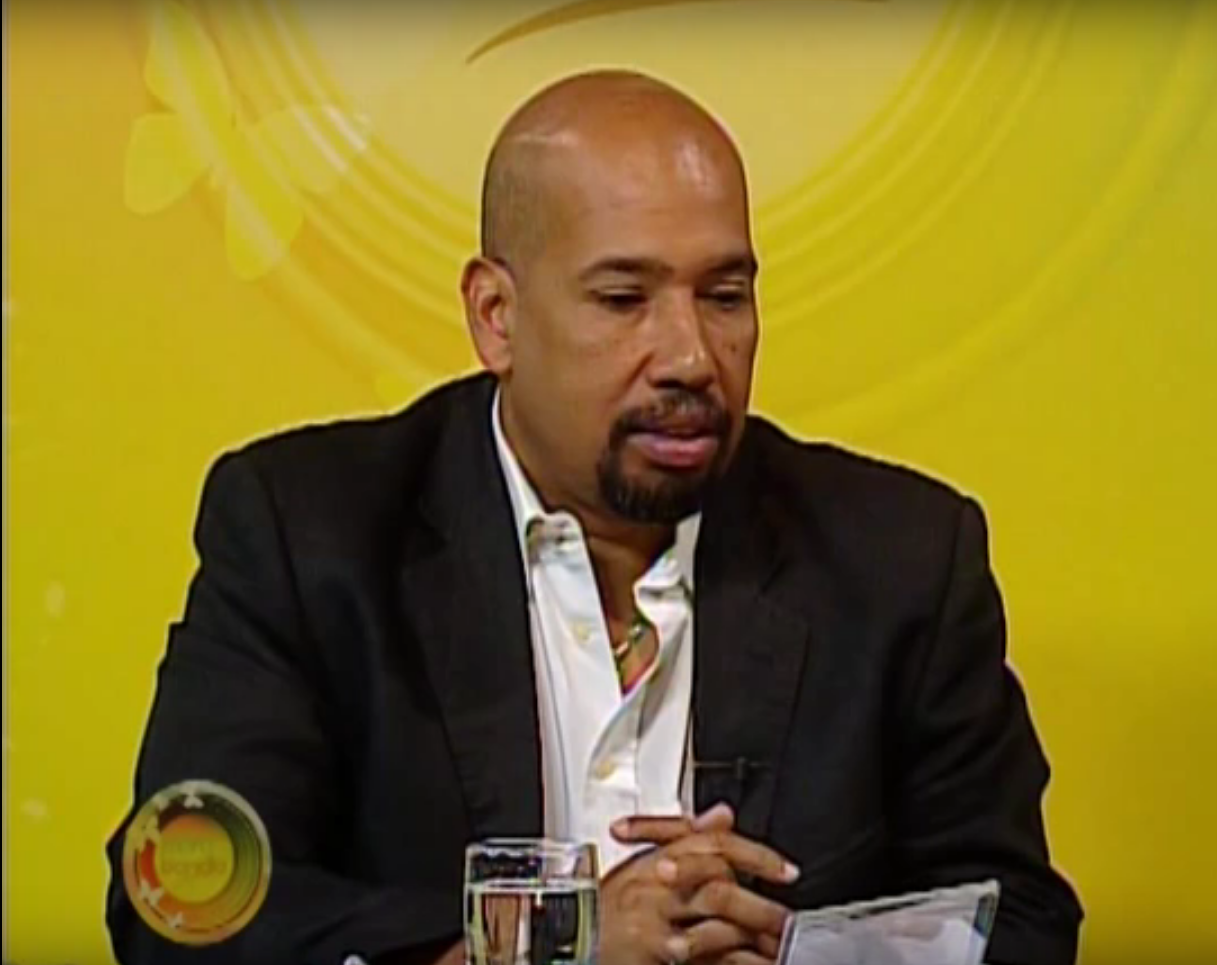
- Jamaloodin in 2014

Minister of Finance
- In office 10 October 2010 – 29 September 2012
- Prime Minister: Gerrit Schotte
- Preceded by: none (office established)
- Succeeded by: José Jardim

Personal details
- Born: George Ranjit Mohamed Jamaloodin; 21 December 1976 (age 49) Steenrijk, Curaçao

George Ranjit Mohamed Jamaloodin (born 21 December 1967) is a Curaçaoan former politician. Between 2010 and 2012 he served as Curaçao's first minister of finance for the Movement for the Future of Curaçao (MFK) under MFK Prime Minister Gerrit Schotte. Jamaloodin is convicted of fraud and soliciting the murder of Helmin Wiels. He was initially sentenced to 28 years in 2019. On appeal in 2021, the sentenced was increased to 30 years.

== Early life and political career ==
Jamaloodin was born on born 21 December 1976 in Steenrijk, Curaçao. His father and mother are of Arab and Surinamese background and were businesspeople. His half-brother is Robbie dos Santos who was involved in the organization of the gambling scene of Curaçao. By age 20 Jamaloodin had a car rental company and also owned a business in security. Jamaloodin was asked to become politically active by his friend Gerrit Schotte who became the first prime minister of Curaçao. Schotte asked him to stand as a candidate for a ministerial position. Schotte then included Jamaloodin in his cabinet as minister of finance for his party, the Movement for the Future of Curaçao (MFK). The cabinet was installed upon the dissolution of the Netherlands Antilles on 10 October 2010.

In January 2011 Jamaloodin claimed to have evidence of illegal campaign financing by the Party for the Restructured Antilles. In May 2011 prime minister Schotte had a falling out with Emsley Tromp, governor of the Central Bank of Curaçao and Sint Maarten. After which Tromp made accusations of corruption against Schotte, Jamaloodin and Nasser El Hakim, the minister of economic development. This led to a political crisis in Curaçao. A political commission under Paul Rosenmöller subsequently concluded that Schotte, Jamaloodin and El Hakim would not have passed the necessary screening for ministers if there would have been enough time to do the screenings. In October 2011 the public prosecutor of Curaçao decided not to pursue charges against the three.

On 29 September 2012 a new interim government under Stanley Betrian was appointed by the governor of Curaçao. Prime minister Schotte however did not agree and called it a coup d'état. Schotte and Jamaloodin decided to stay in Fort Amsterdam, the building of the council of ministers. They stated they wanted to remain until 19 October, the day of the general elections. After the Schotte cabinet fell Jamaloodin was succeeded as minister by José Jardim, who had served as secretary general of the department during Jamaloodin's tenure.

== Criminal charges and convictions ==
On 24 July 2014, Jamaloodin was arrested, according to sources of NOS in relation with the murder of Sovereign People (PS) politician Helmin Wiels on 5 May 2013. Shortly thereafter he started a hunger strike to protest against his detention. On 6 August 2014 Jamaloodin was released while remaining a suspect. In 2016 Jamaloodin and Elmer Wilsoe filed a lawsuit to be struck off as suspects in the case. The request was denied by a judge in October 2016. In March 2017 Jamaloodin was detained in Venezuela. In October 2017 the Supreme Tribunal of Justice determined that Jamaloodin could be extradited to Curaçao.

Jamaloodin was convicted on 15 August 2019 for fraud during his term as a minister of Finance and soliciting the Wiels' murder after that term. He was sentenced to 28-years imprisonment. The judge ruled it to be a political murder. The sentence was appealed at the Joint Court of Justice of Aruba, Curaçao, Sint Maarten, and of Bonaire, Sint Eustatius and Saba. On 8 March 2021, he was sentenced to 30 years without deduction of time spent in Venezuelan detention. In June 2022 the Supreme Court of the Netherlands refused Jamaloodin's cassation request. As of May 2024 Jamaloodin was incarcerated at the Curaçao Centre for Correction and Detention and remained his innocence.

== Personal life ==
As of 2011 Jamaloodin had three children.
