= Amerigo Thodé =

Curaçaoan politician (1950–2023)

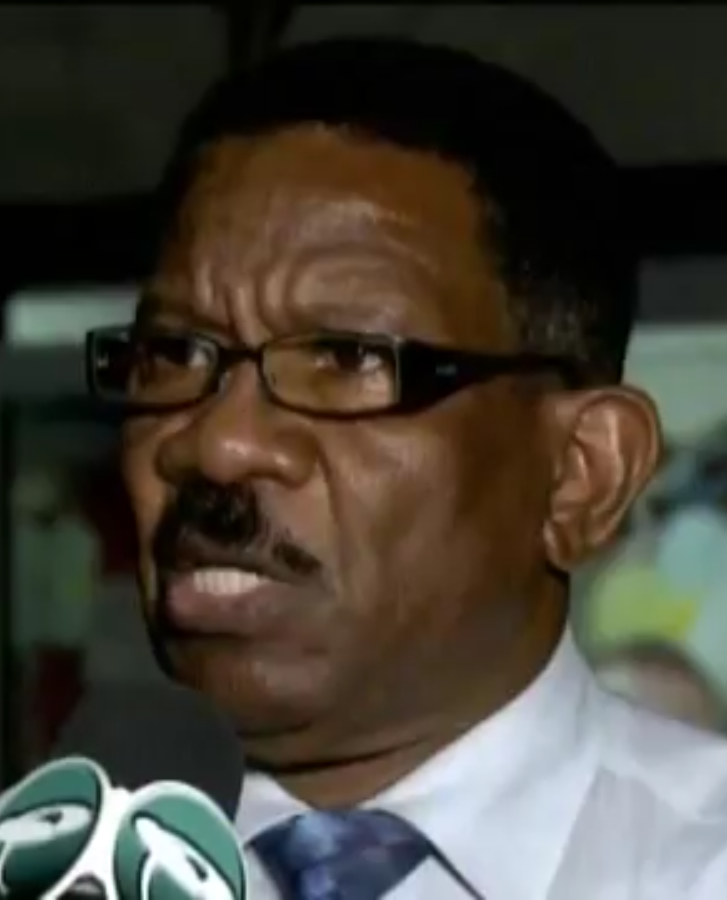
- Thodé in 2014

President of the Parliament of Curaçao
- In office 24 March 2017 – 11 May 2017
- Preceded by: Gilmar Pisas
- Succeeded by: William Millerson
- In office 2 November 2012 – 10 December 2012
- Preceded by: Dean Rozier
- Succeeded by: Marcolino Franco

Personal details
- Born: Amerigo Constantino Maria Thodé; 27 July 1950 Amsterdam, Netherlands
- Died: 14 December 2023 (aged 73) Willemstad, Curaçao
- Party: MFK (from 2010); FOL (before 2010)

Amerigo Constantino Maria Thodé (27 July 1950 – 14 December 2023) was a Curaçaoan politician of the Movement for the Future of Curaçao (MFK). He served as President of the Parliament of Curaçao between November and December 2012 and once again from March to May 2017.

== Life and career ==
Thodé was born on 27 July 1950 in Amsterdam, the Netherlands. During the 1980s Thodé worked as an international volleyball referee. In Curaçao he worked in the private sector until 2010 and served on the board of the chamber of commerce as vice-chairman.

In the 2000s Thodé served as secretary-general of the Party Workers' Liberation Front 30 May (FOL). He was close to Anthony Godett. At the 2006 island council elections he was number 17 on the FOL candidate list and obtained 72 votes. During the 2007 Netherlands Antilles island council elections he was no longer on the candidate list for the party.

By 2010 Thodé had switched to the Movement for the Future of Curaçao (MFK), of which he also became party chair. In the 2010 Curaçao general election he was number 8 on the party list and obtained 163 votes. At the first meeting of the Parliament of Curaçao on 10 October 2010 Thodé was elected vice president. In September 2012 both president of the Parliament, Ivar Asjes, and vice president Thodé were sacked by a political majority. Thodé was succeeded by Godett. For the 2012 Curaçao general election he was number 5 on the candidate list for MFK and obtained 119 votes. On 2 November 2012 Thodé was elected president of the parliament. He resigned as president of the parliament on 6 December 2012 after the MFK was excluded from the new coalition government. He was succeeded four days later by Marcolino Franco. In 2015 Thodé resigned as party chair of MFK.

In January 2016 Thodé was convicted of leaking confidential information from a meeting of the College of Financial Oversight. He subsequently shared this information on a radio show and in an MFK press conference. Thodé was sentenced to a conditional fine of 1400 Netherlands Antillean guilder. An appeal verdict at the Joint Court of Justice of Aruba, Curaçao, Sint Maarten, and of Bonaire, Sint Eustatius and Saba in December 2016 resulted in the same sentence. He appealed to the Supreme Court of the Netherlands on 4 January 2017. In March 2019 the Attorney General at the Supreme Court stated that there were legal grounds to convict Thodé. In October 2019 Thodé lost his appeal.

For the 2016 elections Thodé held the fifth position on the MFK list, obtaining 84 votes. As the MFK won only four seats he did not enter the parliament. When Gilmar Pisas became Prime Minister in March 2017 Thodé returned to the parliament on 24 March and once more became president. For the 2017 Curaçao general election he was number 29 on the party list and obtained 53 votes. William Millerson took over the presidency on 11 May 2017.

Thodé was re-elected during the 2021 Curaçao general election. He had been number 11 on the party list under new leader Pisas and obtained 120 votes. He subsequently served as parliamentary leader for the MFK.

In parliament Thodé served in the commission for kingdom affairs. He was a fierce opponent of a law to implement a Caribbean Organ for Reform and Development (Dutch: Caribisch Orgaan voor Hervorming en Ontwikkeling). His fellow MFK member and Minister of Education, Sithree van Heydoorn, called Thodé one of the best political analysts of the island. Thodé was seen as one of the most experienced members of the parliament and was praised for his broad knowledge. He could be fierce against political opponents and he debated in a loud voice.

== Personal life ==
On 22 November 2023 it was announced Thodé suffered from health issues. He was subsequently hospitalised in the Curaçao Medical Center, where he passed into a coma. He recovered from the coma but could not reassume his position in parliament. Thodé died at Hamied's Hospice in Willemstad on 14 December 2023, at age 73.
