= Government of Curaçao =

The government of Curaçao, a "constituent country" (Dutch: land) of the Kingdom of the Netherlands, takes place in a framework of a parliamentary representative democratic country, whereby the prime minister is the head of government, and of a multi-party system. Executive power is exercised by the government. Legislative power is vested in both the government and parliament. The judiciary is independent of the executive and the legislature. Curaçao has full autonomy on most matters, with the exceptions summed up in the Charter for the Kingdom of the Netherlands under the title "Kingdom affairs". The Constitution of Curaçao was ratified in September 2010, and entered into force on 10 October 2010 upon the dissolution of the Netherlands Antilles.

== Executive power ==
Executive power rests with a governor, and a prime minister heads a Cabinet. The governor of Curaçao is appointed for a six-year term by the monarch (on from 2013: King Willem-Alexander), and the prime minister and deputy prime minister are elected by the Staten for four-year terms.

== Legislative power ==
Legislative power is shared by the government and the legislature. The legislature or Estates of Curaçao (Dutch: Staten) is made up of 21 members elected by direct, popular vote to serve four-year terms. The current composition is shown below

Party	Votes	%	Seats	+/–
Movement for the Future of Curaçao	23,554	27.76	9	+4
Real Alternative Party	11,781	13.89	4	–2
National People's Party	10,573	12.46	4	+4
Partido MAN	5,463	6.44	2	–3
Curaçao is the Best	4,542	5.35	1	New
Work for Curaçao	4,413	5.20	1	New
A Change for Curaçao	3,962	4.67	0	New
Partido Inovashon Nashonal	3,733	4.40	0	–1
Kòrsou Vishonario	3,541	4.17	0	New
Kòrsou di Nos Tur	3,521	4.15	0	–2
Movementu Kousa Promé	2,454	2.89	0	0
Democratic Party	2,391	2.82	0	0
Curaçao a New Dutch Municipality	2,241	2.64	0	New
Movementu Progresivo	1,461	1.72	0	–1
Sovereign People	1,216	1.43	0	–1
Total	84,846	100.00	21	0
Valid votes	84,846	98.68		
Invalid/blank votes	1,132	1.32		
Total votes	85,978	100.00		
Registered voters/turnout	116,146	74.03		
Source: KSE

== Judicial power ==
Curaçao's judicial system, which has mainly been derived from the Dutch civil law system, operates independently of the legislature and the executive. It has one court of first instance, the Gerecht in Eerste Aanleg, and an appeal court, the Joint Court of Justice of Aruba, Curaçao, Sint Maarten, and of Bonaire, Sint Eustatius and Saba, which it shares with the other Dutch entities in the Caribbean. No appeal is possible to decisions of the Joint Court of Justice, but fundamental "questions of law" may be submitted to the Supreme Court of the Netherlands and the Hoge Raad der Nederlanden in cassation. Verdicts by those institutions may lead to a new decision of the Joint Court, taking into account the results of the cassation.
