= 2025 Curaçao general election =

- 21 March 2025
- All 21 seats in the Parliament of Curaçao; 11 seats needed for a majority
- Turnout: 68.74% (▼5.29 pp)
Party	Leader	Vote %	Seats	+/–
MFK	Gilmar Pisas	55.22	13	+4
PNP	Ruthmilda Larmonie-Cecilia	16.31	4	0
PAR	Quincy Girigorie	10.03	2	−2
MAN	Giselle Mc William	8.46	2	0
This lists parties that won seats. See the complete results below.
Prime Minister before	Prime Minister after
Gilmar Pisas; MFK	Gilmar Pisas; MFK

General elections were held in Curaçao on 21 March 2025 to elect the 21 members of the Parliament of Curaçao.

The governing party Movement for the Future of Curaçao (MFK) came in the lead and won an absolute majority with 13 seats, a first in the island's history.

== Background ==
The 2021 general elections led to a change in government. The outgoing coalition suffered a major defeat, with the Real Alternative Party (PAR) and the New Antilles Movement (MAN) losing many of their seats, while the National Innovation Party (PIN) lost all representation in parliament. From the opposition, the pro-independence party Movement for the Future of Curaçao (MFK) was the first-place finisher, winning almost half of the seats.

MFK leader Gilmar Pisas was therefore appointed Formateur by Governor Lucille George-Wout. On 26 March 2021, he signed an agreement for a coalition government between the MFK and the National People's Party (PNP). The new Pisas government was sworn in on 14 June.

== Electoral system ==
Curaçao is a constituent country of the Kingdom of the Netherlands. Its governance takes place in a framework of a parliamentary representative democracy. The King of the Netherlands is the head of state, represented locally by a governor, with the Prime Minister of Curaçao serving as head of government.

The Parliament of Curaçao is unicameral. It is composed of 21 representatives elected for four years according to party-list proportional representation in a single nationwide constituency. Parliament elects the Prime Minister and the Cabinet.

== Primary election ==
In Curaçao, parties with no parliamentary representation must compete in a primary and must receive an equivalent of at least 1% of the total number of votes present in the prior election (in 2021) to participate in the general election. The primary was held on 1 and 2 February. The threshold to advance was 848 votes.

Party	Votes	%
Mihó Kòrsou	1,522	1.79
Movementu Kousa Promé	1,006	1.19
Union i Progreso	720	0.85
Movementu Desaroyo Duradero Kòrsou	525	0.62
Sovereign People	466	0.55
Partido pa Penshonado	165	0.19
Civil Rights Movement Curaçao	84	0.10
ERA NOBO pa Curaçao	52	0.06
Total	4,540	100.00
Valid votes	4,540	98.20
Invalid/blank votes	83	1.80
Total votes	4,623	100.00
Source: KSE at 7:01

== Conduct ==
Election monitoring was assisted by the Caribbean Community.

== Results ==
The MFK, party of the incumbent Prime Minister Gilmar Pisas, won a landslide victory. With 55.2% of the votes, it would receive 13 of the 21 parliamentary seats. This election marked the first time a single party won an absolute majority in Curaçao's parliament. The PNP, coalition partner of the MFK, maintained its four seats. In opposition, the PAR had its parliamentary representation halved, retaining only two seats.

Party	Votes	%	Seats	+/–
Movement for the Future of Curaçao	41,638	55.22	13	+4
National People's Party	12,297	16.31	4	0
Real Alternative Party	7,561	10.03	2	–2
Partido MAN–Partido Inovashon Nashonal	6,378	8.46	2	0
Curaçao is the Best	2,526	3.35	0	–1
Movementu Kousa Promé	1,846	2.45	0	0
Work for Curaçao	1,616	2.14	0	–1
Mihó Kòrsou	1,540	2.04	0	New
Total	75,402	100.00	21	0
Valid votes	75,402	98.00		
Invalid votes	1,302	1.69		
Blank votes	233	0.30		
Total votes	76,937	100.00		
Registered voters/turnout	111,932	68.74		
Source: KSE
