= List of political parties in Curaçao =

This article lists political parties in Curaçao. Curaçao has a multi-party system with a great number of political parties, in which usually a single party does not have a chance of gaining power alone, and thus parties must work with each other to form coalition governments.

== Parties ==
=== Parties represented in Parliament ===
Party	Abbr.	Founded	Leader	Political position	Ideology	MPs
Movement for the Future of Curaçao; Dutch: Beweging voor de Toekomst van Curaçao; Papiamento: Movementu Futuro Kòrsou	MFK	2010	Gilmar Pisas	Centre to centre-right	Curaçao independence Populism	13 / 21
National People's Party; Dutch: Nationale Volkspartij; Papiamento: Partido Nashonal di Pueblo	PNP	1948	Ruthmilda Larmonie-Cecilia	Centre to centre-right	Christian democracy	4 / 21
Real Alternative Party; Dutch: Partij voor Geherstructureerde Antillen; Papiamento: Partido Antiá Restrukturá	PAR	1993	Eugene Rhuggenaath	Centre	Liberalism; Christian democracy	2 / 21
Partido MAN; Dutch: Beweging Verhef de Natie; Papiamento: Movementu Alsa Nashon	MAN	1971	Hensley Koeiman	Centre-left	Social democracy	2 / 21

=== Extraparliamentary and defunct parties ===
Party	Abbr.	Founded	Leader	Political position	Ideology
Democratic Party	DP	1944	Elsa Rozendal	Centre	Liberalism
Workers' Liberation Front; Papiamento: Frente Obrero Liberashon; Dutch: Arbeiders Bevrijdingsfront	FOL	1969	none	Centre-left to left-wing	Social democracy Left-wing populism Curaçao independence
C-93	C93	1993	Stanley Brown		
People's Crusade Labour Party; Papiamento: Partido Laboral Krusada Popular; Dutch: Partij van de Arbeid en de Volksstrijd	PLKP	1997		Centre-left	Labourism; Social democracy
Forsa Kòrsou	FK	2004			
Sovereign People; Papiamento: Pueblo Soberano; Dutch: Sovereign Volk	PS	2005	Ben Whiteman	Left-wing	Curaçao independence Left-wing populism Left-wing nationalism
Party for Advancement and Social Innovation; Papiamento: Partido pa Adelanto I Inovashon Soshal	PAIS	2010		Centre	Social liberalism
Partido Aliansa Nobo	PAN	2010	Amado Rojer		
Kòrsou di Nos Tur	KdNT	2014	Miro Amparo dos Santos		
Movementu Kousa Promé	MKP	2015	René Rosalia		
Movementu Progresivo	MP	2016	Marilyn Moses		
Partido Inovashon Nashonal	PIN	2017	Suzanne Camelia-Römer		
Curaçao is the Best; Dutch: Curaçao is de Beste; Papiamento: Kòrsou Esun Miho	KEM	2019	Michelangelo Martines	Social democracy	Centre-left
Work for Curaçao; Dutch: Werk voor Curaçao; Papiamento: Trabou pa Kòrsou	TPK	2020	Rennox Calmes	Big tent	
Un Kambio pa Kòrsou	UKPK	2020			
Kòrsou un Munisipio Ulandes Nobo	KUMUN	2020			
Kòrsou Vishonario	VISHON	2020	Miles Mercera		

=== See also ===
- List of political parties by country
