= Gerrit Schotte =

Curaçaoan politician (born 1974)

His Excellency Gerrit Schotte
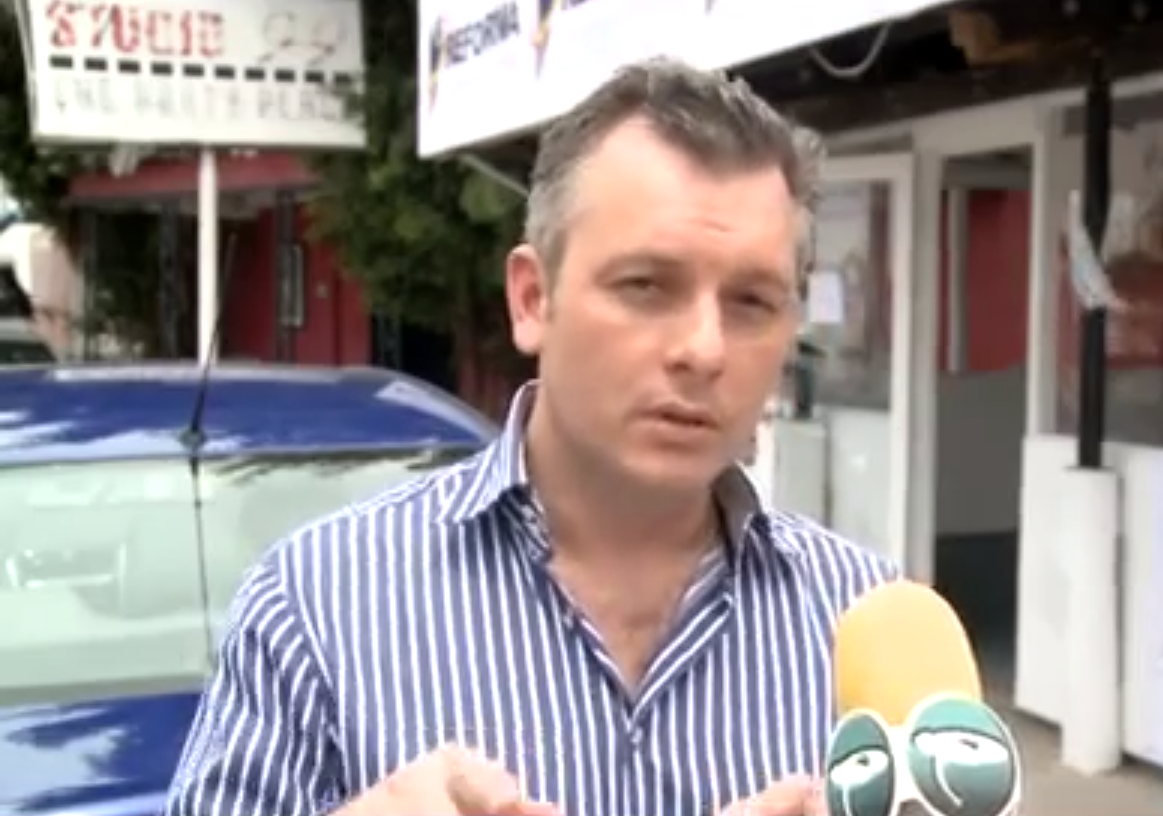
- Schotte in 2014

1st Prime Minister of Curacao
- In office 10 October 2010 – 29 September 2012
- Monarch: Beatrix
- Governor: Frits Goedgedrag
- Preceded by: Position established
- Succeeded by: Stanley Betrian

Leader of Movementu Futuro Kòrsou
- In office 9 July 2010 – 2018
- Preceded by: Office established
- Succeeded by: Gilmar Pisas

Personal details
- Born: 9 September 1974 (age 51) Willemstad, Netherlands Antilles
- Party: Movementu Futuro Kòrsou

Gerrit Fransisco Schotte (Dutch: [ˈɣɛrət frɑnˈsiskoː ˈɕɔtə]; born 9 September 1974) is a former Curaçaoan politician and convicted criminal. A member of Movementu Futuro Kòrsou (MFK), he served as the inaugural prime minister of Curaçao. In the Curaçao general election of 27 August 2010, the MFK became the second-largest party with 5 seats in the Island Council. MFK formed an island government together with Pueblo Soberano and Partido MAN on 4 September. This coalition became the first Cabinet of Curaçao when the Netherlands Antilles was dismantled on 10 October 2010. Schotte at that point became the first prime minister of Curaçao.

Schotte was the first prime minister and minister of General Affairs of the new country of Curaçao, which became autonomous in October 2010. He is one of the youngest persons in modern history to assume the office of Prime Minister. On 29 September 2012 Schotte was succeeded by Stanley Betrian as interim Prime Minister after his resignation.

In March 2016, Schotte was sentenced to 3 years in prison for bribery and money laundering, committed when he was in office as Prime Minister. Schotte appealed the verdict, where the sentence was confirmed.

== Political activity ==
Schotte first gained political experience as an advisor to the political party Frente Obrero (FOL). He became more active in politics when he, with a former member of the Curaçao Island Council, Rignald Lak, founded the political movement Movementu Patriotiko Kòrsou (MPK) in 2005. He was appointed as Commissioner of Tourism and Economic Affairs (February – December 2006) in the Curaçao Island Council for MPK.

Schotte stood for election in the Island Council elections of April 2007 as candidate number seven for the political party MAN. He received 2,370 preference votes. At the age of 32, he was one of the youngest Island Council members. In the parliamentary election of January 2010, Schotte received 9,313 votes as candidate number five on the Lista di Kambi- an election slate with a combination of the political parties MAN, Niun Paso Atras (NPA) and Forsa Kòrsou (FK). Schotte received the highest number of votes for a candidate not a party leader in any election in the Netherlands Antilles. Overall, he had the third largest share of the votes in the entire election.

On 9 July 2010, Schotte founded Movementu Futuro Kòrsou (MFK). MFK received five of the 21 seats in the island council of Curaçao in the 2010 Curaçao general election, which became the Estates of Curaçao on 10 October 2010 upon the dissolution of the Netherlands Antilles.

=== Country Curaçao ===
On 3 September 2010, the parties MFK, Pueblo Soberano (PS) and MAN decided to form a coalition government. On 16 September 2010, the Governor of the Netherlands Antilles appointed Schotte - as formateur for the incoming government of Curaçao per 10 October 2010. Schotte became prime-minister of the government in a 9-minister cabinet.

The Cabinet-Schotte was installed on 10 October 2010:

Main office-holders
| Office | Name | Party | Since |
|---|---|---|---|
| Prime Minister | Gerrit Schotte | MFK | 10 October 2010 |
| Minister of Finance | George Jamaloodin | MFK | 10 October 2010 |
| Minister of Justice | Elmer Wilsoe | PS | 10 October 2010 |
| Minister of Economic Affairs | Abdul Nasser El Hakim | MFK | 10 October 2010 |
| Minister of Health, Environment, and Nature | Jacinta Constancia | MFK | 10 October 2010 |
| Minister of Education | Lionel Jansen | PS | 1 April 2011 |
| Minister of Administration and Planning | Carlos Monk | PS | 9 June 2011 |
| Minister of Infrastructure | Charles Cooper (Curaçao politician) | MAN | 10 October 2010 |
| Minister of Social Development | Hensley Koeiman | MAN | 10 October 2010 |
| Minister Plenipotentiary of Curaçao | Sheldry Osepa | MFK | 10 October 2010 |

After Schotte was forced to resign his cabinet to governor Frits Goedgedrag on August 3, 2012 parliament was dissolved. Until the elections parliament remained in function however, and after a majority in parliament requested the governor to form an interim cabinet until the elections, the governor appointed Eduard Mendes de Gouveia as informer who investigated the possibilities to form such an interim cabinet with a majority in parliament. On his advice, acting governor Van der Pluijm-Vrede (Goedgedrag was abroad for medical treatment) accepted Schotte's resignation which he offered in August, and appointed and swore in Betrian. Schotte however calls this a coup d'etat and initially refused to leave his post. A few days later, however, he left the government building and said to plan to prepare for the upcoming elections.

== Criminal activities ==
On Tuesday 20 May 2014 Schotte was arrested by the Landsrecherche of Curacao in an investigation called "Babel". The two were arrested on the suspicion of more than one count of forgery and money laundering. On 11 March 2016 Schotte was convicted by the Court of Curaçao of the Joint Court of Justice of Aruba, Curaçao, Sint Maarten, and of Bonaire, Sint Eustatius and Saba for bribery, money laundering and forgery of documents and sentenced him to 3 years in prison. He also lost his right to stand in elections for five years. Schotte appealed the verdict. On appeal, the conviction was confirmed on 21 July 2017. He was released from the Curaçao Centre for Correction and Detention on 27 November 2020, after having served two thirds of his sentence.

On 5 April 2017 the homes of Schotte, former Minister Charles Cooper (politician), and a businessman were raided by justice authorities. The three are suspects of the attempted bribery of member of the Estates Yaël Plet.

== Personal life ==
Schotte was born on the island of Curaçao on 9 September 1974, the son of Hendrik Schotte, a teacher, and Maria Ruiz. He did not complete his high school, but gained some entrepreneurial and management skills instead.

He founded “The Shoppers”, a purchasing and import office, (1995-2000), “Bad BoyzToyz”, a paintball club, and “Food4U Delivery Service” (2000-2002), which did not make it due to debt and fraud. He later became the general manager of the Lido Hotel Resort & Casino N.V. (2001 to 2005).

== The Gerrit Schotte Foundation ==
The Gerrit Schotte Foundation (Fundashon Gerrit Schotte) is active in community projects providing assistance to children from lower income families.

Political offices
| Preceded by Position established | Prime Minister of Curaçao; 2010–2012 | Succeeded by Stanley Betrian |
