= Pedro Atacho =

Curaçaoan politician

Minister of Justice of the Netherlands Antilles
- In office 31 March 1994 – 24 March 1998
- Prime Minister: Miguel Pourier
- Governor: Jaime Saleh

Speaker of the Estates of the Netherlands Antilles
- In office 5 October 2007 – 22 September 2010
- Preceded by: Jean Francisca

Member of the Estates of Curaçao
- In office 2010–2012

Personal details
- Born: 20 September 1960 (age 65) Caracas, Venezuela
- Party: Party for the Restructured Antilles (until 2014)

Pedro José Atacho (born 20 September 1960) is a Curaçaoan politician. He was a member of the Party for the Restructured Antilles. During his political career he was Minister of Justice of the Netherlands Antilles from 1994 to 1998. He served in the Estates of the Netherlands Antilles, including a period as Speaker between 2007 and 2010. After the dissolution of the Netherlands Antilles in 2010 Atacho became a member of the Estates of Curaçao.

== Career ==
Atacho was born in Caracas, Venezuela, on 20 September 1960. He was trained as a police officer in the Netherlands. In 1990 Atacho served as head of the narcotics department of Curaçao. In 1994 Atacho became Minister of Justice of the Netherlands Antilles in the cabinet of Miguel Pourier. He intended to resigned on 10 March 1997, after four Venezuelan bankrobbers had escaped from the Koraal Specht prison. A week before three convicted murders also managed to escape. However, Prime Minister Pourier wished that he would continue as Minister. Atacho stayed on and starting later that month Dutch Marines had to assist with keeping prisoners inside the prison terrain. A parliamentary report on the state of the prison system led to Atacho's resignation on 24 March 1998.

During his political career Atacho helped form six cabinets. In 2002 Atacho was informateur and formateur for the first cabinet of Prime Minister Etienne Ys. He also helped to form the second cabinet of Ys in 2004. In 2006 he was informateur for the Emily de Jongh-Elhage cabinet. He also helped to form the last cabinet of the Netherlands Antilles, which was formed after the 2010 Netherlands Antilles general election.

Atacho was member of the Estates of the Netherlands Antilles. He was Speaker from 5 October 2007 to 22 September 2010. While he was Chairman the Estates of the Netherlands Antilles voted for changes to the Statute which led to the possible dissolution of the Netherlands Antilles. Atacho called it "a historic day".

After the dissolution of the Netherlands Antilles Atacho became a member of the Estates of Curaçao. He voted against the 2012 budget. In 2014 Atacho left the Party for the Restructured Antilles, stating he wished to end his political career. In April 2017, after a motion was adopted in the Estates of Curaçao to limit the role of the Governor of Curaçao in the formation process, Atacho stated that the motion would be difficult to ignore and deemed it logical that the Estates should pick its own informateur.
