= Adèle van der Pluijm-Vrede =

Curaçaoan politician

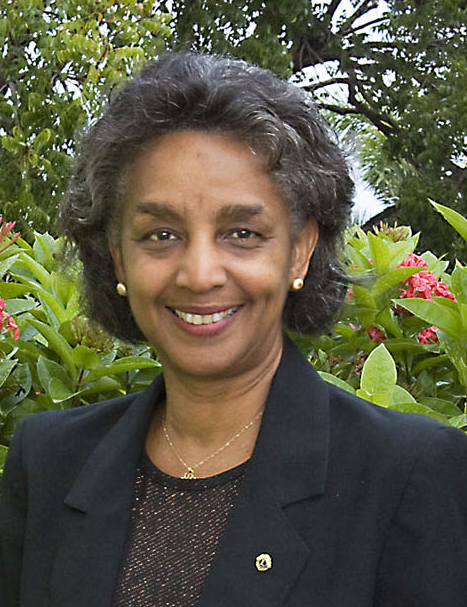

Acting Governor of Curaçao
- In office 24 November 2012 – 4 November 2013
- Prime Minister: Stanley Betrian; Daniel Hodge; Ivar Asjes
- Preceded by: Frits Goedgedrag
- Succeeded by: Lucille George-Wout
- Monarchs: Beatrix; Willem-Alexander
- Governor: Frits Goedgedrag; Lucille George-Wout

Acting Governor of the Netherlands Antilles
- In office 1 April 2002 – 10 October 2010
- Monarch: Beatrix
- Governor: Frits Goedgedrag
- Preceded by: R.M. De Paula
- Succeeded by: office abolished

Personal details
- Born: 1952 (age 73–74) Curaçao
- Profession: Notary

Adèle Pauline van der Pluijm-Vrede (born 1952) is a Curaçaoan politician who served as Acting Governor of Curaçao from October 10, 2010, to November 4, 2013. When then-governor Frits Goedgedrag resigned for health reasons, Van der Pluijm-Vrede remained as acting governor until a new governor was sworn in on 4 November 2013

== Political career ==
From 2002 to 2010 Van der Pluijm-Vrede served as Acting Governor of the Netherlands Antilles, with Frits Goedgedrag being governor. following the dissolution of the Netherlands Antilles in 2010, Van der Pluijm-Vrede was sworn in as acting Governor of Curaçao.

In December 2010, Helmin Wiels, leader of Pueblo Soberano in the Estates of Curaçao called for the resignation of Van der Pluijm-Vrede. According to Wiels, Van der Pluijm-Vrede violated her oath of office.

On 2 January 2013, Van der Pluijm-Vrede swore in the technocrat cabinet of Daniel Hodge, and honorably dismissed the previous interim-cabinet led by Stanley Betrian. The Hodge cabinet was formed as another interim cabinet, this time to handle reforms after the 2012 elections which failed to produce a coalition ready to reform. On 27 March 2013 the Hodge cabinet resigned after there were indications that political parties in Curaçao would be able to form a political cabinet. The Hodge cabinet took caretaker-status. On 5 May 2013, Helmin Wiels, who was involved in the process of cabinet formation, was killed. On 27 May 2013, Van der Pluijm-Vrede was asked by the then coalition of PS, PAIS, PNP and independent member Glenn Sulvaran to install a political cabinet on 3 June 2013. Member of Parliament for PS, Ivar Asjes, resigned his seat to become the new Prime Minister of Curaçao. Formateur Glenn Camelia, who had been appointed previously, handed in his final report to Van der Pluijm-Vrede the same day. The final report contained information regarding the formation and proposed cabinet ministers. Asjes withdrew his resignation from Parliament a few days later, after having received a letter by Van der Pluijm-Vrede which said that the screening on integrity of the new ministers was not yet completed. She said that as a consequence it would not be possible to install the new government on 3 June. On 7 June 2013 Van der Pluijm-Vrede installed the new government under Ivar Asjes.

On 30 April 2013, Van der Pluijm-Vrede was present at the abdication of Queen Beatrix of the Netherlands. She signed the Act of Abdication (Dutch: Akte van Abdicatie) as a witness for the delegation of Curaçao. On 25 June 2013 she swore in her deputy, N.C. Römer-Kenepa, at Fort Amsterdam.

On 4 November 2013 Lucille George-Wout was sworn in by King Willem-Alexander as the new Governor of Curaçao. Van der Pluijm-Vrede resigned as Acting Governor of Curaçao on 1 April 2014. She was appointed an Officer of the Order of Orange-Nassau for her work as Acting Governor.

== Other career ==
Aside from her former position as acting governor, Van der Pluijm-Vrede is a notary. She has her own notary office since 1994.

== Legal issues ==
In October 2011 Van der Pluijm-Vrede was summoned by the United States District Court for the Southern District of Florida. She was summoned after Barney Ivanovic filed charges against her concerning forgery and perverting the course of justice. Ivanovic claimed that on 1 March 2008 he was forced out of the Plaza Hotel in Willemstad, which he claims was his own after he bought it from the Van der Valk hotel chain. He was supposedly threatened under gunpoint by George Jamaloodin, who at the time of the incident was owner of Speedy Security, but at the time of the charges was Minister of Finance of Curaçao. Ivanovic' charges related to the ownership of the building, which Van der Pluijm-Vrede supposedly incorrectly handled. Ivanovic said that at some times he did not know whether he was dealing with a notary or with the acting governor. Van der Pluijm-Vrede refused to go to the court, citing costs and her work as notary and acting governor general. She asked the court to drop the charges. On 9 November 2011 the claims filed by Ivanovic regarding Van der Pluijm-Vrede were dismissed. The presiding judge cited lack of personal jurisdiction as the case concerned foreign nationals and companies, having no relation with Florida. The judge also cited failure to state a claim by Ivanovic. On 20 August 2013 Van der Pluijm-Vrede was heard as witness by the Joint Court of Justice on Curaçao in her capacity as notary concerning the same case.
