= 2010 elections in the Netherlands Antilles =

Multiple elections were held in the Netherlands Antilles in 2010. These include:

- 2010 Netherlands Antilles general election, to elect the members of the Parliament of the Netherlands Antilles.
- 2010 Curaçao general election, to elect the members of the Parliament of Curaçao after dissolution of the Netherlands Antilles.
- 2010 Sint Maarten general election, to elect the members of the Parliament of Sint Maarten after dissolution of the Netherlands Antilles.
