= Abdul Nasser El Hakim =

- عبد الناصر الحكيم
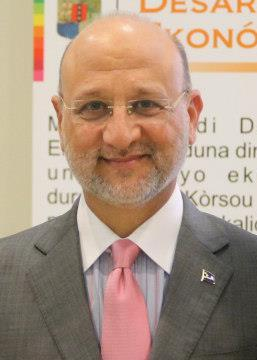

Minister of Economic Affairs
- In office 10 October 2010 – 29 September 2012
- Monarch: Willem-Alexander
- Governor: Lucille George-Wout
- Preceded by: Office established
- Succeeded by: José Jardim

Personal details
- Born: 1 November 1960 (age 65) Beirut, Lebanon
- Party: Movementu Futuro Kòrsou

Abdul Nasser El Hakim (Arabic: عبد الناصر الحكيم; born 1 November 1960) is a Lebanese-born Curaçaoan businessman and politician. He was the first Minister of Economic Development of Curaçao following the dissolution of the Netherlands Antilles in 2010. He was one of the founding members of the political party Movementu Futuro Kòrsou.

== Early life ==
Abdul Nasser El Hakim was born on 1 November 1964, in Beirut, Lebanon and migrated from Lebanon in 1985 to Curaçao.

== Businessman ==
In 1990, El Hakim started his business Optika Hakim and has led the company to grow into the largest optical chain on Curaçao, while also starting several other companies. He was Regional Latin American UNDP Goodwill Ambassador and also translated the Quran into Papiamentu.

== Giro Bank ==
In December 2015 the Giro Bank filed for bankruptcy of El Hakim, the bank claimed 600,000 Netherlands Antillean guilder, an amount which El Hakim disputed. The court ruled that a deferment of payment should be taken before bankruptcy measures. A new court session was planned for 4 February 2016. Later in February El Hakim was declared bankrupt, he had four million guilder in debt to several creditors.

== Social and cultural organizations ==
El Hakim is president of Hakim Foundation, president of World Lebanese Cultural Union-Dutch Caribbean, Chairman of Miss Lebanon Committee, Regional Goodwill Ambassador-Latin America and Founding Member of Movementu Futuro Korsow (Political Party).

== Business related non-profit organizations ==
El Hakim is Vice-President- Latin America (2005) to the Lebanese International Business Council, President to the Caribbean Business Council and President to the Federation of Arab-Latin Chambers of Commerce.
