= Elmer Wilsoe =

Curaçaoan politician (born 1943)

Elmer Raynold "Kadè" Wilsoe (born 11 April 1943) is a Curaçaoan politician. He was Minister of Justice in the Gerrit Schotte cabinet from 2010 until 2012 for Pueblo Soberano (PS). Between 2012 and the October 2016 elections he was a member of the Estates of Curaçao for PS.

== Career ==
Wilsoe was born on 11 April 1943 on Curaçao. He worked as a history teacher before turning to politics.

Wilsoe was Gezaghebber of Curaçao from 1988 to 1994. From October 2010 until 2012 he served as Minister of Justice for Pueblo Soberano (PS) in the cabinet of Prime Minister Gerrit Schotte. In the October 2012 general elections Wilsoe obtained a seat in the Estates of Curaçao.

In September 2016 several pages of criminal proceedings of the Curaçaoan public prosecution service leaked out, which revealed Wilsoe to be a suspect of involvement with the murder of Pueblo Soberano leader Helmin Wiels. Curaçaoan media had earlier reported Wilsoe to be a suspect, which the public prosecution service had always refused to confirm. Wilsoe responded by saying the accusations "left him cold" and that he would not return to the Estates, while retaining his seat. In 2016 Wilsoe and George Jamaloodin filed a lawsuit to be struck off as suspects in the case. The request was denied by a judge in October 2016. In January 2017 a similar second request by Wilsoe also failed.
