= C93 =

C93 may refer to:

- C93 (Netherlands Antilles), a political party
- Ruy Lopez, Smyslov Variation chess openings ECO code
- C93FM, a Christchurch-based New Zealand radio
- Monocytic leukemia ICD-10 code
- Wages, Hours of Work and Manning (Sea) Convention (Revised), 1949 code
- C-93 Conestoga, a World War II American military aircraft
- Borchardt C-93, an 1893 pistol
- Current 93, an English experimental music band
- C93, a civilian version of the HK93 semi-automatic rifle
