= Curaçao Centre for Correction and Detention =

Prison in Curaçao

- Location in Curaçao
- Location: Willemstad, Curaçao; 12.092430°N 68.891745°W
- Status: Operational
- Security class: Minimum to maximum
- Population: 400 (December 2014)
- Opened: March 1960
- Former name: Koraal Specht prison (unofficial, 1960–2001), Bon Futuro prison (2001–2010)
- Director: Urny Florán

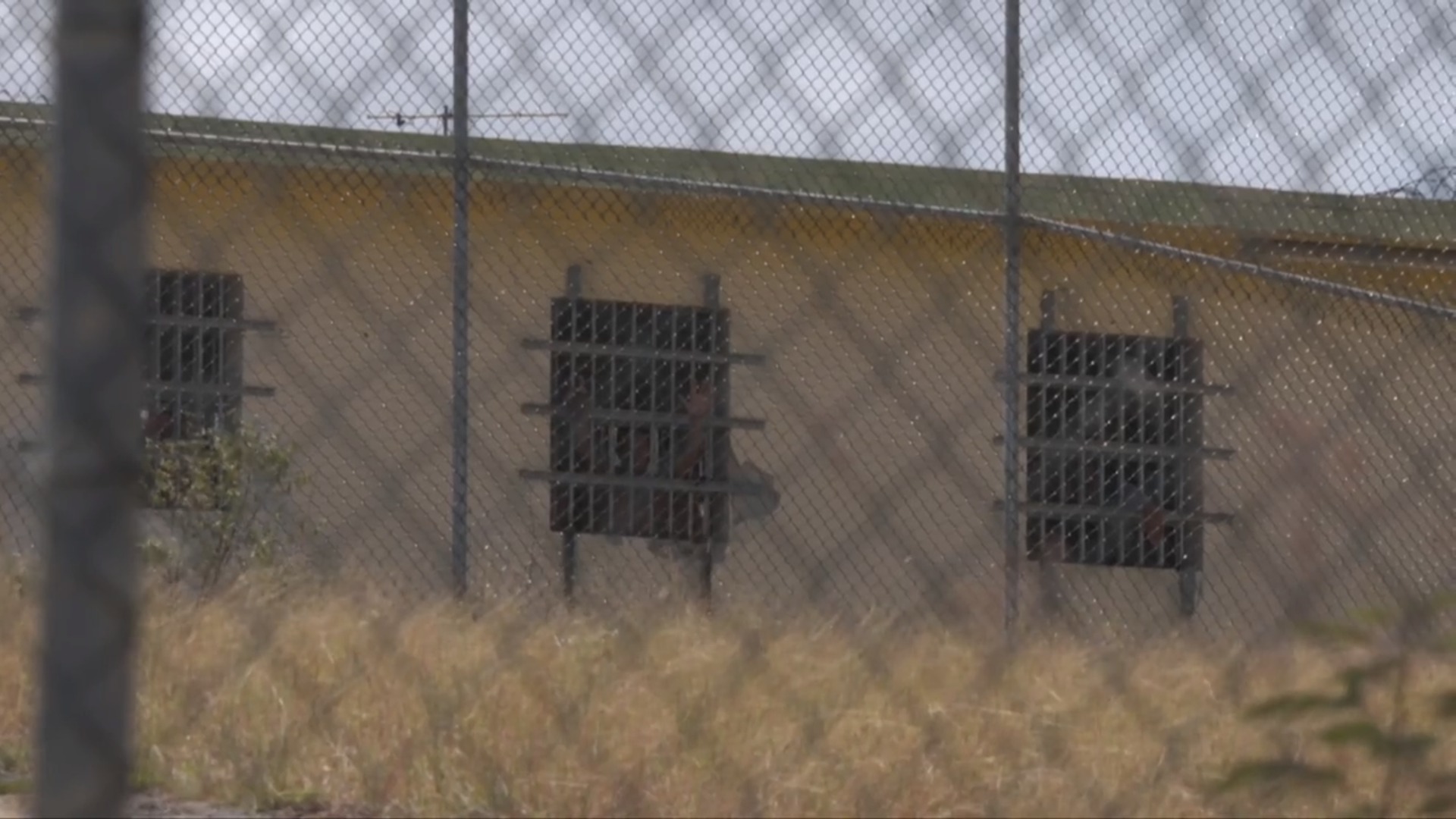

Curaçao Centre for Correction and Detention (Papiamento: Sentro di Detenshon i Korekshon Kòrsou, SDKK; Dutch: Centrum voor Detentie en Correctie Curaçao) is the only prison on the Caribbean island of Curaçao. Since the construction of the prison in 1960 the prison has also been known as the Koraal Specht-prison, after the name of the neighbourhood it is located in. After renovations around the year 2001 the prison changed its name to Bon Futuro prison, meaning good future. At the Dissolution of the Netherlands Antilles on 10 October 2010 the prison changed its name once more and became the Sentro di Detenshon i Korekshon Kòrsou. During its existence the prison has been noted for ill treatment of prisoners and poor conditions. International, Dutch, Antillean and Curaçaoan investigations have found problems frequently. As of December 2014 the facility holds around 400 prisoners.

== History ==
=== Koraal Specht prison ===
The prison was founded in 1960 as place to lock away prisoners in the Netherlands Antilles. It was intended with a maximum of 250 prisoners.

In 1996 prisoners staged an uproar and around 100 of them managed to get out of their cells and occupy the main court of the prison. Police had to be called in to end the uprising, with warning shots being fired. In the months after the incident there were several violent outbreaks after guards had been bribed, a total of 21 prisoners escaped. In March 1997 Justice Minister Pedro Atacho intended to resign after four Venezuelan bank robbers escaped from the prison. Starting later that month Dutch Marines from the Marinekazerne Suffisant had to assist with keeping prisoners inside the prison terrain. In February 1998 a prisoner was killed, the likely reason was that he had discovered a secret escape tunnel.

In 1998 once again reports arose of bad conditions. During a process called the "soul train" prisoners had to run along a line of prison guards armed with batons. Guards would beat them as they passed. Other incidents were an uproar in which a prisoner was shot in the leg, the discovery of several firearms and the digging of an escape tunnel by prisoners. Dutch member of Parliament Hubert Fermina said he felt sick at seeing the conditions in which prisoners were held, but was also surprised at the lack of day-time activities for prisoners. A Curaçaoan lawyer said that his Colombian and Venezuelan clients said conditions at Koraal Specht were worse off than in their home countries. The Dutch House of Representatives had demanded action by Dutch minister of Kingdom Relations, Joris Voorhoeve. It threatened with putting the prison under direct Dutch control if the Minister would not take appropriate action. Dutch Labour Member of the House of Representatives, Gerritjan van Oven, said that the Kingdom of the Netherlands could not make itself an advocate of human rights in the world if there were human rights violations in its own territory. The Dutch Government assisted the Dutch Antillean government by sending money and experts. The Antillean Minister of Justice Atacho however wished to emphasize that the Antillean government would be responsible in the end. The parliamentary report on the state of the prison system led to Atacho's resignation on 24 March 1998.

=== Bon Futuro Prison ===
Dutch Antillean Minister of Justice Rutsel Martha announced the name Bon Futuro prison on 19 April 2001. Around the year 2001 renovations were made to the prison after several prisoners had complained to the European Committee for the Prevention of Torture and Inhuman or Degrading Treatment or Punishment. The Committee then visited the site and indeed noted several problems, it called the conditions in the prison inhumane. The main issues were overcrowding, sanitary conditions, quality of food and outdated ventilation systems. Apart from the living conditions the Committee also noted reports of corruption by guards, mistreatment by guards and violence between prisoners, some of which had a sexual nature. Murders had also occurred. The government of the Netherlands Antilles was urged to improve conditions and close the punitive cells at once. The government then launched an investigation which also found corruption by prison guards and led to the sacking of the great majority of all 200 prison guards. Regular police then replaced the prison guards. The Netherlands was troubled by the failing attitude of the Netherlands Antilles government and paid for the renovations and training of new prison guards. The renovations led to the construction of a new youth wing and a maximum security area. In July 2010 a state of emergency was declared within the prison to improve the security.

=== Sentro di Detenshon i Korekshon Kòrsou ===
In 2010, just before the name change, the prison had a capacity of 362 prisoners, however the prison held much more, being at 172% occupancy. On 10 October 2010 the prison was renamed to Sentro di Detenshon i Korekshon Kòrsou (SDKK). The new name was chosen to show the integrity and correctional nature of the institution. At the same time the construction of two new buildings started, one entry building and a prisoners workplace. In July 2012 a prisoner was killed by gunfire by another prisoner, Curaçaoan Justice Minister Elmer Wilsoe declined to give a response. Another commission evaluating the prison in 2012 and 2013 deemed the prison "out of control". During May 2013 the commission sent an urgent letter to Curaçaoan Prime Minister Daniel Hodge and Ronald Plasterk, Dutch Minister of Kingdom Relations. Curaçaoan Justice Minister Nelson Navarro then set up a task force to solve the issues. Undermanning and lack of authority of the prison director and management team were seen as the main causes for the state of the prison. Both the director and staff suffered from intimidation and threats by the inmates. A follow-up rapport in September 2013 deemed that plans that had been made should provide the prison with a positive outlook. With the issue of undermanning looking to be solved.

On 15 May 2014 two prisoners managed to escape. A large breakout attempt was prevented in December 2014 after a tip-off. Several of the bars in a number of cells had already been cut. A sweep of cells after the discovery of the plan found mobile phones, drugs and self-made weapons. On 27 December additional security measures were taken with 100 soldiers of the Royal Netherlands Army being deployed around the facility. Furthermore, barbed wire was erected around the prison, a helicopter was put on stand-by and military personnel was fully armed and wearing masks to be unrecognizable. According to director Urny Florán the measures were taken because of the transfer of two prisoners to the Netherlands, one of those had escaped in May. The Curaçaoan Justice Minister had asked the Governor of Curaçao for aid, who turned to the Dutch government. The military support ended on 13 January 2015. In 2017 prison personnel made a public outreach to the Netherlands, stating that complaints were not followed up by the prison authorities and public prosecutor. After acknowledging an increasing number of drones supplying prisoners with illegal contraband the public prosecutor in October 2018 explicitly forbade flying drones above the facility.

On 13 October 2020 there was a fire in several barracks at the SDKK which were used as holding facility for Venezuelans facing deportation and some detainees managed to escape.
