= Charetti America-Francisca =

Curaçao politician

Her Excellency Charetti America-Francisca
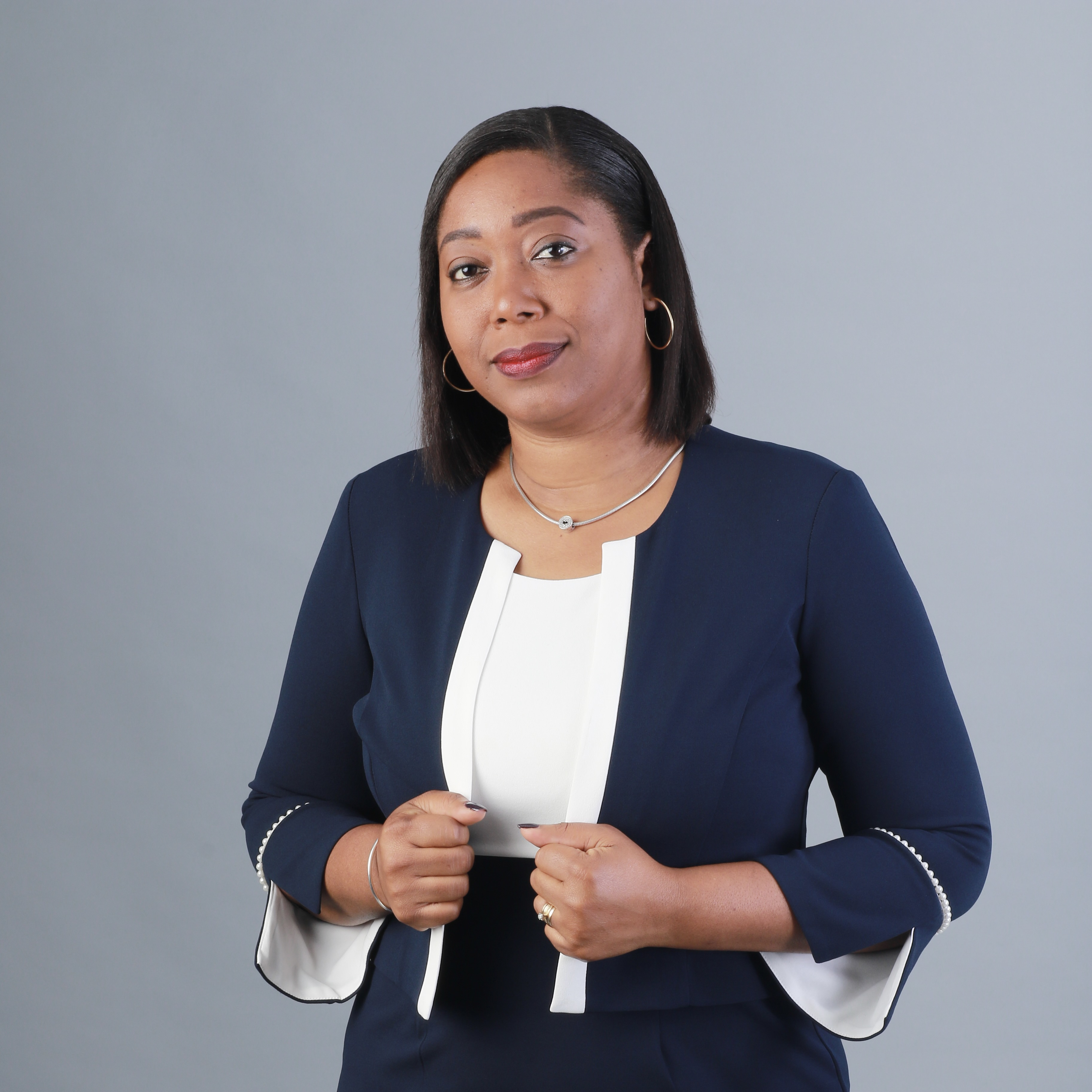

President of the Parliament of Curaçao
- In office 11 May 2021 – 7 April 2025
- Preceded by: Ana-Maria Pauletta
- Succeeded by: Fergino Brownbill

Personal details
- Born: 13 April 1981 (age 44) Curaçao
- Party: Movement for the Future of Curaçao
- Spouse: Andy America
- Children: 5
- Website: charettiamerica.com

Charetti Maria America-Francisca (born 13 April 1981) is a Curaçaoan politician who has been the President of the Parliament of Curaçao from 2021 to 2025, and was a member of parliament as a member of the Movement for the Future of Curaçao.

== Early life and education ==
Charetti Maria Francisca was born in Curaçao, on 13 April 1981, to Vilma Francisca and Harry Felipa. She was raised in Desavaan and started working as a baker at age 11. She graduated from Maria College and the Academy for Bedrijfs Management, where she studied business management. She founded the Curaçao Charity Foundation and Curaçao Youth Care.

== Career ==
In the 2016 election America-Francisca won a seat in the Parliament of Curaçao as a member of the Movement for the Future of Curaçao. She was reelected to her seat in the 2017 election.

America-Francisca was elected President of the parliament on 11 May 2021, with no opposition. She has called for the parliament to reside in one building rather than using multiple buildings. The level of maturity in parliamentarian debate in 2024 was criticised by America-Francisca. She called for ministers in the government to increase their efforts in answering questions from members of parliament. Fergino Brownbill was elected to succeed her as president on 7 April 2025.

America-Francisca became a member of the executive board of the Latin American Parliament in 2024.

== Personal life ==
America-Francisca married Andy America, with whom she had five children. She knew Andy in her youth and has been married to him for over twenty years.

== Works cited ==
=== News ===
- "Curaçao's new parliament mainly wants to restore unity". Curacao Chronicle. 12 May 2021. Archived from the original on 3 July 2025.
- "Fergino Brownbill Named New President of Parliament in Curaçao". Curacao Chronicle. 7 April 2025. Archived from the original on 3 July 2025.
- "Parliament chair calls for better responses to questions from ministers". Curacao Chronicle. 17 July 2024. Archived from the original on 3 July 2025.
- "Parliament chair calls for increased maturity during meetings". Curacao Chronicle. 10 September 2024. Archived from the original on 3 July 2025.
- "Parliament Speaker takes on role in Parlatino leadership". Curacao Chronicle. 12 May 2021. Archived from the original on 3 July 2025.
- Breel, Ellen (12 May 2021). "Charetti America-Francisca is nieuwe voorzitter van de Staten". Curacao News. Archived from the original on 3 July 2025.
- Breel, Ellen (11 April 2022). "Staten willen één parlementsgebouw om coalitie en oppositie onder te brengen". Curacao News. Archived from the original on 3 July 2025.

=== Web ===
- "Charetti America". Charetti America-Francisca. Archived from the original on 22 March 2025.
