= William Millerson =

Dutch karateka

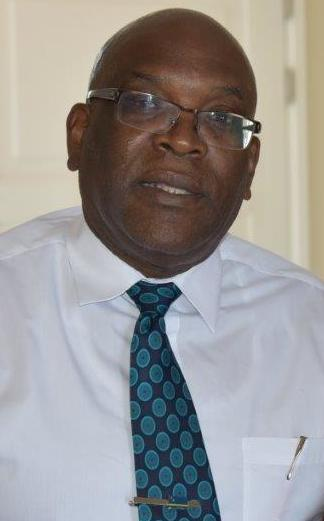
- Millerson in 2017

President of the Estates of Curaçao
- In office 11 May 2017 – 3 June 2020
- Preceded by: Amerigo Thodé
- Succeeded by: Ana-Maria Pauletta

Personal details
- Born: William Walter Millerson; 10 January 1953 Aruba
- Died: 20 June 2020 (aged 67)
- Party: Party for the Restructured Antilles
- Occupation: Politician; Karateka
- Martial arts career
- Style: Karate
- Teacher: Jack van Hellemond
- Rank: 8th dan Wado Ryu karate

William Millerson (10 January 1953 – 20 June 2020) was a Curaçaoan politician and Dutch karateka. He had an 8th Dan in karate, and was the winner of multiple European Karate Championships medals. Between 1998 and 2014 he was first vice-president of the World Karate Federation. In 2011 Millerson was invested as a Knight of the Order of Orange-Nassau.

== Early life and sports career ==
Millerson was born on 10 January 1953 in Aruba. He was partially of Surinamese descent. Millerson started to become interested in Wadō-ryū karate while studying in the Netherlands. He began to train under Jack van Hellemond, who had been taught by sensei Ishikawa, the Japanese karate master. In 1973 he became the Dutch champion. Later that year he won silver in the European Karate Championships. He would win the European championship two times. In 1975, Millerson won bronze in the 1975 World Championship. In 1976, Millerson became champion of Latin America in Guatemala and champion of the Caribbean in Santo Domingo.

In 1997, Millerson became the President of the Netherlands Antilles Olympic Committee. On 10 October 2010, the Netherlands Antilles dissolved, and Curaçao became a country within the Kingdom. In January 2011, the International Olympic Committee denied Curaçao permission to compete under their own flag, because it was not a fully independent country. Millerson argued for a similar status as Hong Kong. The IOC refused to reconsider their decision, because it would set a precedent, and England wanted to compete separately from the United Kingdom. Since then athletes from the Antilles either have to compete stateless, for Aruba, who was recognized prior to the new rules, or for the Netherlands. (Note: The country of the Netherlands is also a country within a Kingdom, however it is allowed to compete separately, because it is a member of the United Nations, thus meeting the definition of a sovereign state according to the International Olympic Committee.) Millerson described the situation as the biggest blunder of the International Olympic Committee.

Millerson was one of the founders of the Caribbean Karate Federation and served as its chairman from 1998 to 2014. He was chairman of the Panamerican Karate Federation from 1993 to 2013.

== Political career ==
Millerson ran as a candidate for the Party for the Restructured Antilles in the 2017 Curaçao general election. On 11 May 2017 he was elected President of the Estates of Curaçao. All 19 members present voted for him.

Millerson, suffering from cancer, resigned as president for health reasons on 3 June 2020, and was replaced by Ana-Maria Pauletta. On 4 June 2020, Millerson was hospitalized in the Netherlands. He told the Estates before leaving, "I'll be back," however he died on 20 June 2020, aged 67.
