= 2012 Curaçao general election =

- 19 October 2012
- All 21 seats in Parliament; 11 seats needed for a majority
- Turnout: 76.10% (▲10.29 pp)
Party	Leader	Vote %	Seats	+/–
PS	Helmin Wiels	22.67	5	+1
MFK	Gerrit Schotte	21.21	5	0
PAR	Emily de Jongh-Elhage	19.75	4	−4
PAIS	Alex Rosaria	17.58	4	+4
MAN	Charles Cooper	9.54	2	0
PNP	Humphrey Davelaar	5.90	1	0
FOL	Anthony Godett	2.06	0	−1
This lists parties that won seats. See the complete results below.
Prime Minister before	Prime Minister after
Gerrit Schotte; MFK	Stanley Betrian; Independent

General elections were held in Curaçao on 19 October 2012. Early elections for the Curaçao island council were necessary as Gerrit Schotte's cabinet lost its majority in the Estates of Curaçao. The elections were the first of the Curaçao after obtaining the status of country (Dutch: land) within the Kingdom of the Netherlands upon the dissolution of the Netherlands Antilles in 2010. The election saw six parties obtain one or more of the 21 seats, with Sovereign People and Movement for the Future of Curaçao both winning five.

== Background ==
The Schotte-cabinet relied on a majority of 11 out of 21 seats in the Estates (the parties Movementu Futuro Korsou (MFK), Pueblo Soberano (PS) and Movishon Antia Nobo (MAN)). When Eugene Cleopa (MAN) and MFK parliamentary leader Dean Rozier decided to leave their fraction, and to stay in the Estates as an individual party, the Cabinet lost its majority. The move of Cleopa and Rozier was a result of problematic relationship with the Netherlands and charges of corruption and nepotism of the Schotte government.

== Primary elections ==
All prospective parties that had no seats in the Estates prior to the election, needed in order to qualify for participation in the elections to obtain 743 support votes: 1% of the number of valid votes during the 2010 elections. The vote took place on 8 and 9 September 2012 amongst the parties.

Party	Votes	%
Party for Advancement and Social Innovation	4,195	5.64
Democratic Party–Labour	1,019	1.37
Partido Aliansa Nobo	449	0.60
Total	5,663	100.00
Valid votes	5,663	97.81
Invalid/blank votes	127	2.19
Total votes	5,790	100.00
Source: KSE

== Opinion polls ==
In August and September 2012, opinion polls were conducted among the potential voters indicating they would vote and who already had decided what to vote.

Curaçao general elections, polls 2012
Parties	2010 elections % (Seats)	August 2012 poll % (Seats)	September 2012 poll % (Seats)	October 2012 (seats)
Partido Antiá Restrukturá (PAR)	30 (8)	34 (8)	16 (3)	(4)
Movementu Futuro Korsou (MFK)	21 (5)	27 (6)	26 (6)	(5)
Pueblo Soberano (PS)	19 (4)	20 (5)	26 (6)	(4)
Movishon Antia Nobo (MAN)	9 (2)	6 (1)	5 (1)	(1)
Partido Frente Obrero Liberashon 30 Di Mei (FOL)	7 (1)	2 (0)	3 (0)	(1)
Partido Nashonal di Pueblo (PNP)	6 (1)	4 (0)	1 (0)	(1)
Party for Advancement and Social Innovation (PAIS)	3 (0)	5 (1)	21 (5)	(4)
Democraat/Laboral (Parti Democraat Laboral)	5 (0)	2 (0)	2 (0)	(1)
Others	0 (0)	1 (0)	4 (0)	(0)
Source	Election results	University of Curaçao	University of Curaçao	Fundashon Pro Pueblo

== Results ==
116,857 people were eligible to vote by satisfying three main criteria, being residents of Curaçao of at least 18 years of age with Dutch citizenship. The elections were supervised by observers from Aruba, Sint Maarten, Trinidad and Tobago and the Dominican Republic. The final results were:

Party	Votes	%	Seats	+/–
Sovereign People	19,715	22.67	5	+1
Movement for the Future of Curaçao	18,450	21.21	5	0
Party for the Restructured Antilles	17,179	19.75	4	–4
Party for Advancement and Social Innovation	15,286	17.58	4	+4
Partido MAN	8,294	9.54	2	0
National People's Party	5,130	5.90	1	0
Workers' Liberation Front	1,790	2.06	0	–1
Democratic Party–Labour	1,127	1.30	0	0
Total	86,971	100.00	21	0
Valid votes	86,971	97.79		
Invalid/blank votes	1,963	2.21		
Total votes	88,934	100.00		
Registered voters/turnout	116,857	76.10		
Source: KSE

== Aftermath ==
Based on these results, PS, MFK and MAN (the 2010 coalition parties) had a majority in the estates, and decided to form a government. The parties signed a declaration to that effect (termed the Zeelandia declaration), while acting governor Adele van der Pluijm-Vrede appointed Glenn Camelia as "informateur" to advise her on a suitable majority government. MFK pulled out of negotiations on 28 October, stating unfavorable comments of PS-leader Wiels on radio as the cause. A majority was formed based on PS, PAIS, PNP and Glenn Sulvaran (who had left PAR to become an independent member of parliament), which formed an interim cabinet led by Daniel Hodge.

The interim cabinet was succeeded by the cabinet-Asjes on 7 June 2013.
