= Panamerican Karate Federation =

Governing body of the sport karate

- Abbreviation: PKF
- Formation: year 1975
- Legal status: Federation
- Headquarters: Buenos Aires, Argentina
- Location: Americas
- Official language: English is the official language. If any question in respect to the sport or technique of karate, it will be referred to the original Japanese text.
- President: William Millerson
- Affiliations: WKF
- Website: http://www.karatepkf.com/

The Panamerican Karate Federation (PKF) is the governing body of sport karate of about 37 countries of national karate federation in the Americas. The PKF was founded in 1975 with original name PUKO (Panamerican Union of Karate Organization) with 13 countries founder the PUKO in Long Beach, California, USA, and in 1995 it officially change the name to Panamerican Karate Federation. PKF is duly recognized by the World Karate Federation, the largest international governing body of sport karate with over 130 member countries. It is the only karate organization recognised by the International Olympic Committee and has more than ten million members. The PKF organized juniors and seniors Championship in many countries in Panamerica and participates in WKF World Karate Championships. The President of the PKF is William Millerson.

== History of PKF ==
The PUKO was founded in October 1975. The foundation act took place in the room “Mayfair” the Queen Hotel Mary in Long Beach, California. The countries founders were Argentina, Bermuda, Canada, El Salvador, Guatemala, Mexico, Panama, Paraguay, Dominican Republic, Trinidad and Tobago, the United States and Venezuela.

This first Championship of the PUKO was organized in the island of Curaçao on 1–3 May 1981, with the participation of 10 countries. It is remarkable that William Millerson was the organizer of the championship, was trainer and coach of his team, as well as he was competing. And it gained to Billy Blanks in the end of the category +80 kg to him.

During the Pan-American championship of 1990 in Niterói, Brazil, was where several countries of the South America, like Argentina, Chile, Colombia and Uruguay, began to participate very actively in the championships of the PUKO. In 1991 there was a participation record of 26 countries, in the organized Pan-American Championship in Curaçao.

The Karate participate for the first time in the Central American and Caribbean Games in 1993 in Ponce, Puerto Rico and for the first time in the Pan-American Games in 1995 in Mar del Plata, Argentina. In 1995 during the Junior Pan-American Championship in Medellín, the new Statutes of the PUKO were approved and at the same time change the name of the organization to Panamerican Karate Federation P.K.F.
