= Steenrijk =

- Neighbourhood
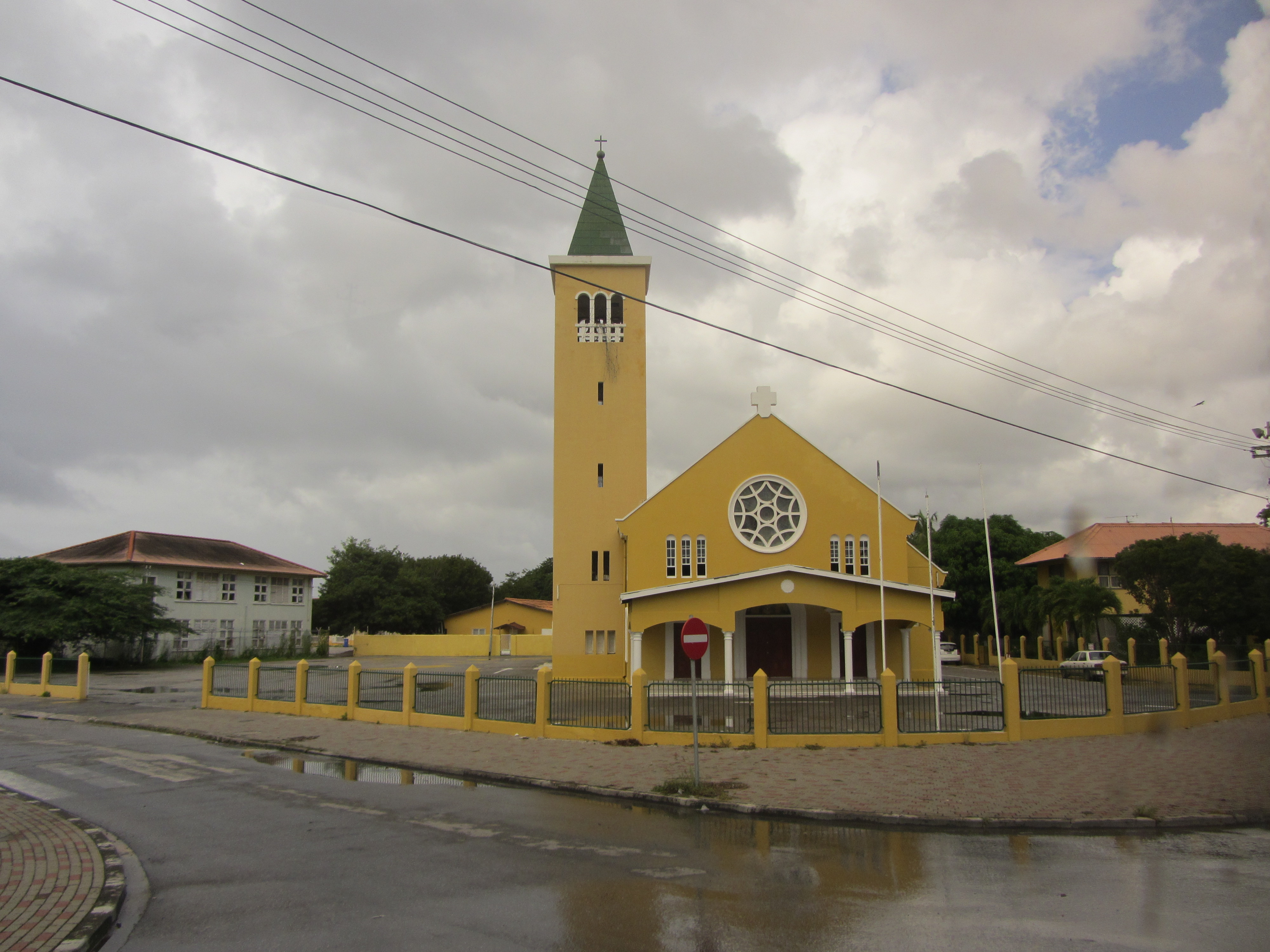
- Anglican Church in Steenrijk

- Location in Curaçao
- Coordinates: 12.09788°N 68.91214°W
- State: Kingdom of the Netherlands
- Country: Curaçao
- City: Willemstad

Area
  - Total: 1.05 km^{2} (0.41 sq mi)

Population (2011)
  - Total: 3,752
  - Density: 3,570/km^{2} (9,250/sq mi)

Steenrijk is a neighbourhood of Willemstad, Curaçao. It is located about one kilometre south-east of the centre of Willemstad, and has the highest population density of the island.

== History ==
Steenrijk used to be a forested area. In 1791, the Maria Pompoen plantation was established. In 1804, the Steenrijk plantation followed. Both plantations were small scale. Until 1925, the economy was based on subsistence agriculture and fishing. The booming oil and phosphate industry of the early 20th century, resulted in a population increase, and the transformation of Steenrijk into a residential zone.

The Dutch word "steenrijk" translates to "filthy rich", however Steenrijk is a poor neighbourhood with an average income of 22% below the average for Curaçao.

Steenrijk has a large number of shops, supermarkets, bars, restaurants and hotels. During World War II, a coastal battery was built in Steenrijk to protect the island from U-boats. The ruins of the battery can still be seen, and have been declared a monument.

== Notable people ==
- George Jamaloodin (born 1967), Minister of Finance and convicted criminal.

== Bibliography ==
- Buurtprofiel Steenrijk (2011). "Buurtprofiel Steenrijk" (PDF). Government of Curaçao (in Dutch).
