= Latin American Parliament =

Organization of countries of Latin America and the Caribbean

Coordinates: 8.944185°N 79.553225°W

Latin American Parliament Parlamento Latinoamericano (Spanish) Parlamento Latino-americano (Portuguese) Latijns-Amerikaanse parlement (Dutch)
- Parlatino flag

Type
- Type: Unicameral

History
- Founded: 10 December 1964

Leadership
- President of the Latin American Parliament: Elías Castillo, PRD since 30 November 2012
- Alternate President of the Latin American Parliament: Fernando Cordero Cueva, PAIS since 30 November 2012
- General-Secretary of the Latin American Parliament: Blanca Alcalá, PRI since 30 November 2012
- Alternate General-Secretary of the Latin American Parliament: Leonardo Cabezas, PCC since 30 November 2012
- Committees Secretary of the Latin American Parliament: Daisy Tourné, PSU since 30 November 2012
- Inter-Parliamentary Relations Secretary of the Latin American Parliament: Walter Gavidia, PSUV since 30 November 2012
- Inter-Institutional Relations Secretary of the Latin American Parliament: Nancy Susana González, PJ since 30 November 2012
- Delegate President of the Latin American Parliament: Jorge Pizarro, PDC since 30 November 2012
- Vice Presidents of the Latin American Parliament: 23: Inés Beatriz Lotto Vecchietti (FPV); Alfred Marlon Sneek (AVP); Julio Salazar (MAS); Flexa Ribeiro (PSDB); Rosauro Martínez (RN); Luis Emilio Sierra (Colombian Conservative Party); Rita Gabriel Chaves Casanova (Accessibility without Exclusion); Charetti America-Francisca (MFK); Virgilio Hernández (PAIS Alliance); Sigfrido Reyes Morales (FMLN); Christian Jacques Boussinot Nuila (TODOS); Norma Haydee Calderón (PLH); Mariana Gómez del Campo (PAN); Iris Marina Montenegro Blandón (FSLN); Héctor Eduardo Aparicio (PRD); Victor Bogado González (ANR-PC); Daniel Abugattás (PNP); Teodoro Ursino Reyes (PLD); Rodolphe Emile Samuel (National Alliance (Sint Maarten)); Carlos Baraibar Ponce de León (Uruguay Assembly); Rodrigo Cabeza Morales (PSUV)

Structure
- Seats: 276
- Committees: 13: Committee on Cattle-raising and fisheries Committee on Citizen safety, combat and prevention of narcotraffic, terrorism and organized crime Committee on Economic affairs, social debt and regional development Committee on Education, culture, science, technology and communication Committee on Energy and mines Committee on Environment and tourism Committee on Gender equity, childhood and youth Committee on Health; Committee on Human rights, justice and prison policies Committee on Indigenous peoples and ethnic groups Committee on Labour, social security and legal affairs Committee on Political, municipal and integration affairs Committee on Utilities and defence of users and consumers

Meeting place
- Latin American Parliament building, Amador, Panama City, Panama

Website
- www.parlatino.org

The Latin American and Caribbean Parliament (Parlatino) is a regional, permanent Inter-parliamentary institution organization bringing together parliamentarians from Latin America and the Caribbean. It is a consultative assembly made up of national parliamentarians, similar in format to the Parliamentary Assembly of the Council of Europe. Currently the institution is being considered to become the legislative organ of the Community of Latin American and Caribbean States.

== Origins, mandate, principles and purpose ==
The Latin American and Caribbean Parliament (Parlatino) was created in 1964. Its current mandate is derived from the Treaty of Institutionalization which was ratified on 16 November 1987. Situated in Panama City, Panama, the Parlatino has 23 member parliaments, each of which sends to it 12 nominated plenipotentiaries. The plenipotentiaries must represent the views of their parent parliament, and take into consideration the principles of the Parliament which include the defence of democracy and the further intergeneration of Latin America. The purposes of the Parlatino are:

- To promote human rights and economic and social development;
- To maintain and foster relations with other "geographic parliaments" (such as the Parliamentary Assembly of the Council of Europe, the European Parliament and other international organizations);
- To promote self-determination and counter imperialism and colonialism.

== Institutions ==
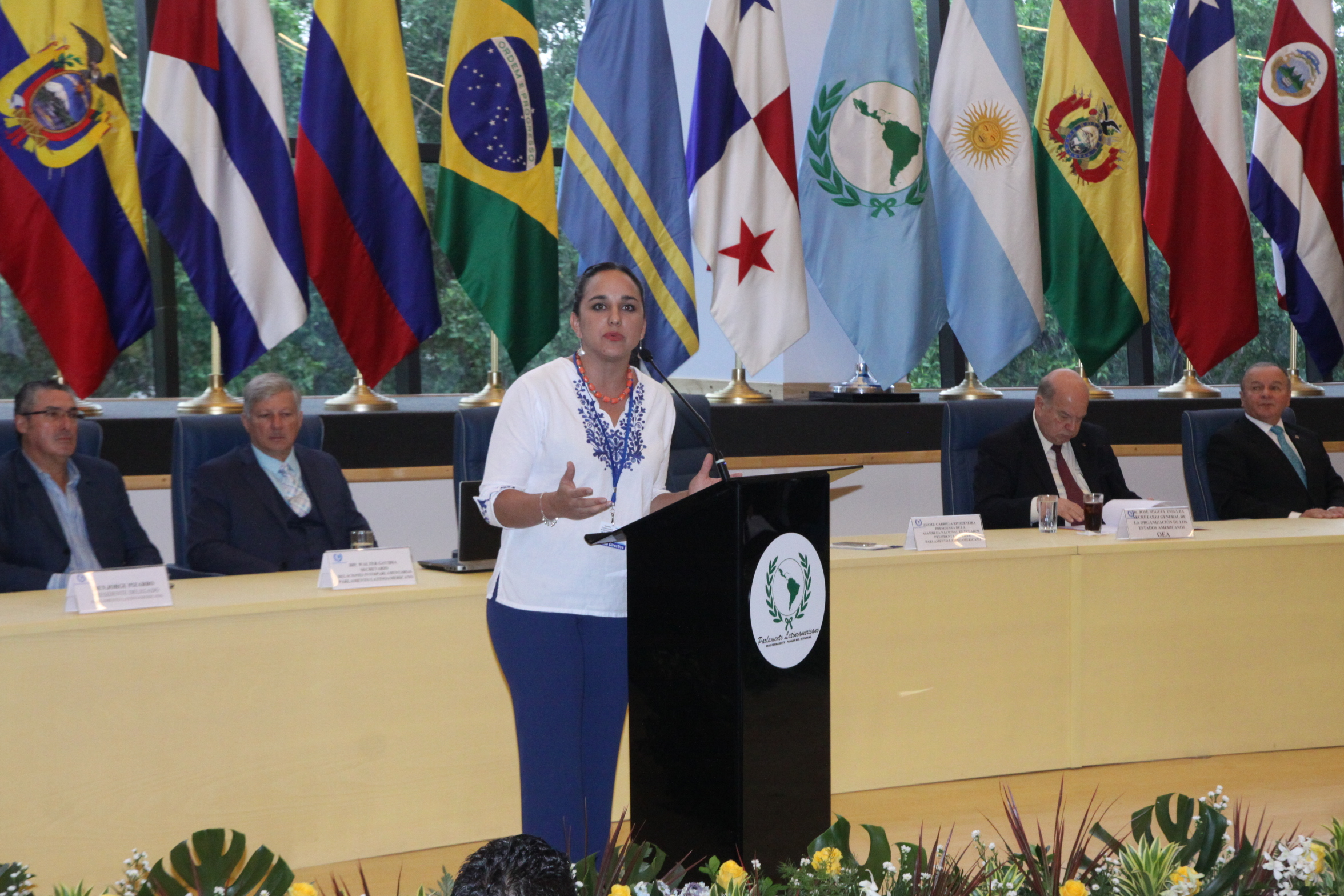
Assembly of the organ.

The main institutions of the Parlatino are:

- The unicameral Plenary Assembly which meets annually;
- The Board of Directors of the Plenary Assembly which is chaired by the President of the Assembly and oversees the work of the Parlatino between the Assembly's sessions.
- In 2009 there were thirteen permanent committees:
  - Cattle-raising and fisheries;
  - Citizen safety, combat and prevention of narcotraffic, terrorism and organized crime;
  - Economic affairs, social debt and regional development;
  - Education, culture, science, technology and communication;
  - Energy and mines;
  - Environment and tourism;
  - Gender equity, childhood and youth;
  - Health;
  - Human rights, justice and prison policies;
  - Indigenous peoples and ethnic groups;
  - Labour, social security and legal affairs;
  - Political, municipal and integration affairs;
  - Utilities and defence of users and consumers.

== Members ==
Member countries of the Latin American Parliament

As of 2013, the following countries and territories are members of the Latin American Parliament:

- Argentina
- Brazil
- Bolivia
- Chile
- Colombia
- Costa Rica
- Cuba
- Dominican Republic
- Ecuador
- El Salvador
- Guatemala
- Honduras
- Mexico
- Kingdom of the Netherlands
  - Aruba
  - Curaçao
  - Sint Maarten
- Nicaragua
- Panama
- Paraguay
- Peru
- Suriname
- Uruguay
- Venezuela

== See also ==
- Andean Parliament
- Central American Parliament
- Mercosur Parliament
- South American Parliament (proposed)
- Union of South American Nations
- Community of Latin American and Caribbean States (CELAC)
- Latin American Economic System
- Latin American Free Trade Association
- Latin America Memorial
- Latin American Integration Association (LAIA)
