= Lucille George-Wout =

Curaçaoan politician

Her Excellency Lucille George-Wout
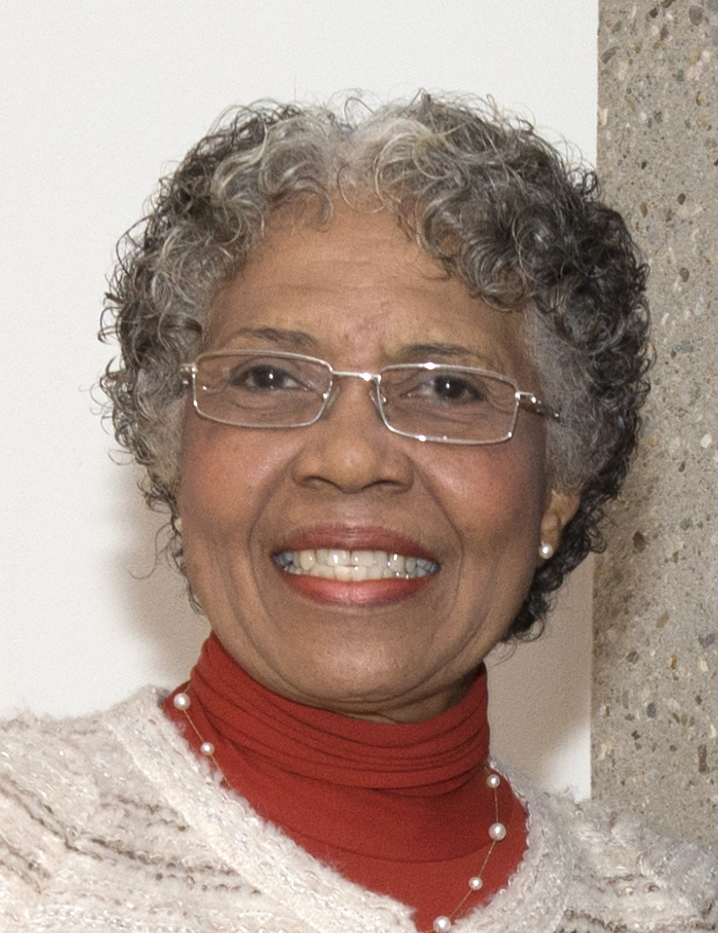

2nd Governor of Curaçao
- In office 4 November 2013 – 4 November 2025
- Monarch: Willem-Alexander
- Prime Minister: Ivar Asjes; Ben Whiteman; Hensley Koeiman; Gilmar Pisas; Eugene Rhuggenaath; Gilmar Pisas
- Preceded by: Frits Goedgedrag; Adèle van der Pluijm-Vrede (acting)
- Succeeded by: Mauritsz de Kort

Minister for Work and Social Affairs of the Netherlands Antilles
- In office 1999–2001

Speaker of Parliament of the Netherlands Antilles
- In office 1994–1998

Personal details
- Born: 26 February 1950 (age 76) Curaçao
- Spouse: Herman George

Lucille Andrea George-Wout (born 26 February 1950) is a Curaçaoan politician who has served as the second governor of Curaçao from 4 November 2013 til 4 November 2025.

== Political career ==
George-Wout was a member of parliament for the Partido MAN in the Island Council of Curaçao in the early 1990s. As a politician for the Party for the Restructured Antilles (PAR), she was speaker of the Parliament of the Netherlands Antilles from 1994 to 1998. She also served as minister for work and social affairs of the Netherlands Antilles for the same party between 1999 and 2001.

On 1 November 2013 Ronald Plasterk, minister of the interior and kingdom relations of the Netherlands, nominated George-Wout in the Council of Ministers of the Kingdom of the Netherlands, with her appointment commencing on 4 November 2013. She was sworn in by King Willem-Alexander of the Netherlands on the same day, becoming the second governor of Curaçao. George-Wout had to formally accept the office in a solemn session of the Estates of Curaçao. By acceding to the function of governor of Curaçao, George-Wout replaced Frits Goedgedrag, who left the office in November 2012 because of health problems. His functions had been temporarily performed by acting governor Adèle van der Pluijm-Vrede.

At the end of her term as governor of Curaçao, she was promoted by King Willem-Alexander to Commander of the Order of Orange-Nassau for her exceptional services in the field of public administration, culture and social cohesion. On 15 October 2025, State Secretary for the Interior and Kingdom Relations Eddie van Marum presented her with the insignia at the Governor's House in Fort Amsterdam.

== Personal life ==
Lucille George-Wout is married to Herman George.
