= 2021 Curaçao general election =

- 19 March 2021
- All 21 seats in Parliament; 11 seats needed for a majority
- Turnout: 74.03% (▲7.63 pp)
Party	Leader	Vote %	Seats	+/–
MFK	Gilmar Pisas	27.76	9	+4
PAR	Eugene Rhuggenaath	13.89	4	−2
PNP	Ruthmilda Larmonie-Cecilia	12.46	4	+4
MAN	Steven Martina	6.44	2	−3
KEM	Michelangelo Martines	5.35	1	New
TPK	Rennox Calmes	5.20	1	New
This lists parties that won seats. See the complete results below.
Prime Minister before	Prime Minister after
Eugene Rhuggenaath; PAR	Gilmar Pisas; MFK

General elections took place in Curaçao on 19 March 2021, two days after the 2021 Dutch general election.

== Electoral system ==
The 21 members of the Estates are elected by proportional representation. Parties that won at least one seat in the 2017 election were allowed to participate automatically and a primary election was held to determine which non-parliamentary parties could run. In the primary, these parties were required to win the equivalent of 1% of the votes cast in the previous general election in order to participate.

== Primary election ==
In Curaçao, parties with no parliamentary representation must compete in a primary, and must receive an equivalent of at least 1% of the total number of votes present in the prior election (in 2017) to participate in the general election. The primary was held on 30 and 31 January. The threshold to advance was 789 votes.

Party	Leader	Votes	% of 2017 turnout	Qualified
National People's Party	Ruthmilda D. Larmonie-Cecilia	3,374	4.22	Yes
Curaçao is the Best	Michelangelo Martines	2,686	3.36	Yes
Work for Curaçao	Rennox Calmes	2,216	2.77	Yes
A Change for Curaçao	Raichel Sintjacoba	1,514	1.89	Yes
Democratic Party	Elsa Rozendal	1,492	1.87	Yes
Curaçao with Vision	Miles B.M. Mercera	1,303	1.63	Yes
Movementu Kousa Promé	René Rosalia	1,285	1.61	Yes
Curaçao a New Dutch Municipality	Luigi Faneyte	942	1.18	Yes
MAVIS Party	Mavis Albertina	758	0.95	No
KAS Movement	Humphrey Davelaar	746	0.93	No
Union and Progress	Elvis F. de Andrade	627	0.78	No
Party for the Wellbeing of Curaçao	Julius Koko	547	0.68	No
A New Curaçao	Peter Alberto	520	0.65	No
Awor Ta Basta	Marulla Chirino	350	0.44	No
New Alliance Party	Amado Rojer	176	0.22	No
People for Progress Movement	Marco Tyrol	62	0.07	No
Total valid votes		18,598		
Total invalid votes		597		
Total blank votes		29		
Total votes		19,224		
Source: Supreme Electoral Council of Curaçao

== Campaign period ==
On 7 March, the fourth candidate on the list of Work for Curaçao, Almier Godett, was shot and killed while trying to calm a family dispute.

== Results ==
Party	Votes	%	Seats	+/–
Movement for the Future of Curaçao	23,554	27.76	9	+4
Real Alternative Party	11,781	13.89	4	–2
National People's Party	10,573	12.46	4	+4
Partido MAN	5,463	6.44	2	–3
Curaçao is the Best	4,542	5.35	1	New
Work for Curaçao	4,413	5.20	1	New
A Change for Curaçao	3,962	4.67	0	New
Partido Inovashon Nashonal	3,733	4.40	0	–1
Kòrsou Vishonario	3,541	4.17	0	New
Kòrsou di Nos Tur	3,521	4.15	0	–2
Movementu Kousa Promé	2,454	2.89	0	0
Democratic Party	2,391	2.82	0	0
Curaçao a New Dutch Municipality	2,241	2.64	0	New
Movementu Progresivo	1,461	1.72	0	–1
Sovereign People	1,216	1.43	0	–1
Total	84,846	100.00	21	0
Valid votes	84,846	98.68		
Invalid/blank votes	1,132	1.32		
Total votes	85,978	100.00		
Registered voters/turnout	116,146	74.03		
Source: KSE
