= Curaçao is the Best =

Curaçao is the Best Kòrsou Esun Miho
- Dutch name: Curaçao is de Beste
- Leader: Michelangelo Martines
- Founder: Michelangelo Martines
- Founded: 17 December 2019
- Headquarters: Willemstad
- Ideology: Social democracy
- Political position: Centre-left
- Colours: Gold
- Estates of Curaçao: 0 / 21

Website
- www.partidokem.com

Curaçao is the Best (Dutch: Curaçao is de Beste, Papiamento: Kòrsou Esun Miho), abbreviated as KEM, is a political party in Curaçao. The party was founded at the end of 2019 and takes a social democratic stance. The party campaigns on cooperation with the Netherlands, job growth and increasing the minimum wage.

The party took part in the 2021 elections with Michelangelo Martines as party leader and former FOL politician Anthony Godett as the party's secondary choice. There were also many other former FOL candidates who had support of the party.

When the party won a seat during the election, it refused to join in a coalition with the Real Alternative Party.

== Election results ==
Election	Leader	Votes	%	Seats	+/–	Government
2021	Michelangelo Martines	4,542	5.35 (#5)	1 / 21	▲1	Opposition
2025	Michelangelo Martines	2,526	3.35 (#4)	0 / 21	▼1	Extra-parliamentary
