= Constitution of Curaçao =

Curaçao is one of the four autonomous countries of the Kingdom of the Netherlands (with Aruba, the Netherlands and Sint Maarten). It has a constitution (Dutch: staatsregelingen) which governs its constitutional organization and which has been approved by a country law (Dutch: landverordening) adopted by a two-thirds majority of the local parliament, in application of Chapter IV of the Charter for the Kingdom of the Netherlands (Dutch: Statuut voor het Koninkrijk der Nederlanden) dating from 1954 and reformed in 2010.

The Constitution of Curaçao (Dutch: Staatsregeling van Curaçao; Papiamento: Konstitushon di Kòrsou) was adopted by a 15 to 6 vote majority in the island council of Curaçao on 5 September 2010. In the initial vote on the constitution in July, the two-thirds majority required was not reached, after which new elections were held on 27 August. The newly elected island council could then adopt the constitution with an ordinary majority.

The constitution entered into force on 10 October 2010, on the date of the dissolution of the Netherlands Antilles.
