= 2010 Curaçao general election =

- 27 August 2010
- All 21 seats in Parliament; 11 seats needed for a majority
- Turnout: 65.81% (▼0.71 pp)
Party	Leader	Vote %	Seats	+/–
PAR	Emily de Jongh-Elhage	30.23	8	+1
MFK	Gerrit Schotte	21.46	5	+5
PS	Helmin Wiels	18.68	4	+3
MAN	Eunice Eisden	8.79	2	−3
FOL	Anthony Godett	6.47	1	−1
PNP	Humphrey Davelaar	6.17	1	−1
PD	Norberto Vieira Ribeiro	4.10	0	−1
LNPA	Carlos Monk	0.45	0	−2
This lists parties that won seats. See the complete results below.
Prime Minister after
Gerrit Schotte; MFK

Island Council elections were held in Curaçao on 27 August 2010. Early elections were necessary because the island council failed to approve a proposed new constitution with a two-thirds majority in the first reading. Before it could be adopted by a simple majority in the second reading, the Charter for the Kingdom of the Netherlands specified that a general election had to be held.

Although the elections were held for the island council of Curaçao, its newly elected members automatically became members of the Parliament of Curaçao when Curaçao became a constituent country within the Kingdom of the Netherlands on 10 October 2010.

== Results ==
Although the Party for the Restructured Antilles increased its number of seats from 7 to 8, the coalition it led lost its majority. Gerrit Schotte of the Movementu Futuro Korsou (MFK) formed a coalition with Movishon Antia Nobo (MAN) and Pueblo Soberano (PS) and thus became Curaçao's first Prime Minister on 10 October 2010.

Party	Votes	%	Seats	+/–
Party for the Restructured Antilles	22,474	30.23	8	+1
Movement for the Future of Curaçao	15,953	21.46	5	New
Sovereign People	13,886	18.68	4	+3
Partido MAN	6,531	8.79	2	–3
Workers' Liberation Front	4,813	6.47	1	–1
National People's Party	4,588	6.17	1	–1
Democratic Party	3,048	4.10	0	–1
Partido pa Adelanto I Inovashon Soshal	2,202	2.96	0	New
People's Crusade Labour Party	509	0.68	0	0
LNPA	336	0.45	0	–2
Total	74,340	100.00	21	0
Valid votes	74,340	98.37		
Invalid/blank votes	1,231	1.63		
Total votes	75,571	100.00		
Registered voters/turnout	114,828	65.81		
Source: KSE
