= Governor of Curaçao =

Representative on Curaçao of the Dutch head of state

Governor's standard

The governor of Curaçao (Dutch: gouverneur van Curaçao; Papiamento: gobernador di Kòrsou) is the representative on Curaçao of the Dutch head of state, King Willem-Alexander. The governor's duties are twofold: representing and safeguarding the general interests of the Kingdom of the Netherlands and serving as head of the Government of Curaçao. The governor is accountable to the government of the Kingdom of the Netherlands.

As head of the government, the governor enjoys immunity and exercises executive authority under the responsibility of the ministers, who are accountable to the Estates of Curaçao. The governor does not bear political responsibility and is not a member of the cabinet. During the formation of a cabinet, however, the governor plays an important constitutional role.

The governor is appointed by the monarch for a term of six years, which may be renewed once for an additional six-year term. The governor is supported by the Cabinet of the Governor and is advised by the Council of Advice (Raad van Advies), which consists of at least five members appointed by the governor. The council provides advice on draft state ordinances, state decrees, Kingdom Acts, and general administrative orders.

== List of governors ==
On 10 October 2010, Curaçao attained the status as a separate country within the Kingdom of the Netherlands (status aparte). Before this date the governor of the Netherlands Antilles was also the governor of Curaçao.

The first governor of Curaçao was Frits Goedgedrag, who also was governor of the Netherlands Antilles before that country's dissolution on 10 October 2010. He resigned at the end of 2012 for health reasons, after which his responsibilities were taken over by acting governor Adèle van der Pluijm-Vrede (who had taken up her office on 10 October 2010 as well). Acting Governor Adèle van der Pluijm-Vrede swore in her deputy as second acting governor, N.C. Römer-Kenepa, on 24 June 2013 at Fort Amsterdam.

On 4 November 2013 Lucille George-Wout was sworn in by King Willem-Alexander as the new governor of Curaçao.

On November 4 2025 Mauritsz de Kort was sworn in by King Willem-Alexander as the new governor of Curaçao.

No.	Portrait	Name (lifespan)	Term of office			Prime Ministers	Monarch (reign)
No.	Portrait	Name (lifespan)	Took office	Left office	Time in office	Prime Ministers	Monarch (reign)
1		Frits Goedgedrag (born 1951)	10 October 2010	24 November 2012	2 years, 45 days	Schotte; Betrian	Beatrix r. 1980–2013
–	Portrait of Adèle van der Pluijm-Vrede	Adèle van der Pluijm-Vrede (born 1952); Acting	24 November 2012	4 November 2013	345 days	Betrian; Hodge; Asjes	Beatrix r. 1980–2013
2	Portrait of Lucille George-Wout	Lucille George-Wout (born 1950)	4 November 2013	4 November 2025	12 years, 0 days	Asjes; Whiteman; Koeiman; Pisas; Rhuggenaath; Pisas	Willem-Alexander r. 2013–present
3		Mauritsz de Kort (born 1973/4)	4 November 2025	Incumbent	283 days	Pisas	Willem-Alexander r. 2013–present

== See also ==
- Major-General (later General) John Studholme Hodgson, appointed governor and commander-in-chief of the Island of Curaçao by the British government (which ruled Curaçao from 1807 to 1815) in 1811.
