= Stanley Betrian =

Curaçaoan politician

His Excellency Stanley Betrian

2nd Prime Minister of Curaçao
- In office 29 September 2012 – 31 December 2012
- Monarch: Beatrix
- Governor: Frits Goedgedrag; Adèle van der Pluijm-Vrede (acting)
- Preceded by: Gerrit Schotte
- Succeeded by: Daniel Hodge

Personal details
- Born: 1 November 1951 (age 74)

Stanley Mario Betrian (born 1 November 1951) is a Curaçaoan politician who served as the second prime minister of Curaçao, in an interim capacity. He was sworn in on 29 September by Acting Governor Adèle van der Pluijm-Vrede. He led the government until a cabinet was formed, following the elections of 19 October 2012.

== Netherlands Antilles ==
From 1983 to 1992, Betrian was executive vice-president of the Bank of the Netherlands Antilles and from 1992 to 1994 Lieutenant-Governor of Curaçao, when the island was still part of the Netherlands Antilles.

== Minister-president ==
The appointment of Betrian followed a period of political turmoil in Curaçao that started upon the creation of the new status of Curaçao as a semiautonomous "country" within the Kingdom of the Netherlands. After Gerrit Schotte submitted the resignation of his cabinet to Governor Frits Goedgedrag on August 3, 2012, the parliament was dissolved. However, the parliament remains in function until the elections. After a majority in parliament requested the governor to form an interim cabinet until an elected cabinet takes office, he appointed Dito Mendes as formateur. On his advice, acting governor Van der Pluijm-Vrede (Goedgedrag was abroad for medical treatment) accepted Schotte's resignation, which he had submitted in August, and appointed Betrian as Prime Minister in an interim capacity. Nonetheless, Schotte calls this a coup d'état and refused to leave his post.

With the election, Betrian became prime minister in a demissionary capacity. Following the election, Betrian was succeeded by Daniel Hodge on 31 December 2012.

Political offices
Preceded by Elmer Raynold Wilsoe	Lieutenant Governor of Curaçao; 1994–2000	Succeeded by Lizanne Marie Richards-Dindial
Preceded by Gerrit Schotte	Prime Minister of Curaçao; 2012	Succeeded by Daniel Hodge
