= Frits Goedgedrag =

Dutch Antillean politician

Governor of Curaçao
- In office 10 October 2010 – 22 October 2012
- Monarch: Beatrix
- Preceded by: Position established
- Succeeded by: Lucille George-Wout

Governor of the Netherlands Antilles
- In office 2002–2010
- Monarch: Beatrix
- Preceded by: Jaime Saleh
- Succeeded by: Position abolished

Lieutenant Governor of Bonaire
- In office 1992–1998
- Monarch: Beatrix
- Preceded by: George G.A Soliana
- Succeeded by: Richard R.N Hart

Personal details
- Born: Frits Martinus de los Santos Goedgedrag; 1 November 1951 (age 74) Aruba
- Spouse: Dulcie Terborg
- Children: 3

Frits Martinus de los Santos Goedgedrag (born 1 November 1951 in Aruba) is a Dutch Antillean politician who was the first governor of Curaçao following the dissolution of the Netherlands Antilles. He was governor of the Netherlands Antilles from 2002 to 2010 and during his tenure, he oversaw the dissolution of the Netherlands Antilles and Curaçao becoming a constituent country within the Kingdom of the Netherlands. He took up the post of governor of Curaçao in 2010 but resigned for health reasons in 2012 after suffering heart problems. In 2013 he was appointed to serve on the Dutch Council of State and has since served as mediators and sat on commissions and committees relating to the Caribbean Netherlands.

== Governor roles ==
From 1992 to 1998, Goedgedrag was lieutenant governor of Bonaire. He succeeded Jaime Saleh in 2002 to become the governor of the Netherlands Antilles and remained in this post until the dissolution of the Antilles in 2010. He refused to name the 2003 Curaçao general election party leader as formateur, citing a criminal investigation. Goedgedrag instead appointed Mirna Louisa-Godett as formateur. On 10 October 2010 Goedgedrag became the first Governor of Curaçao. In May 2012 he criticised a decision by the cabinet of Curaçao to relocate the island's civil registry to the former St Thomas College, citing cost and security concerns.

Goedgedrag left Curacao on 27 September 2012 for urgent medical treatment due to heart problems. He sustained no permanent damage but resigned the position for health reasons on 22 October. At his farewell ceremony he was knighted as a Commander in the Order of Orange-Nassau. A replacement governor, Lucille George-Wout, was appointed to take the post on 4 November.

== Later career ==
In May 2013, Goedgedrag was appointed to the Council of State for extraordinary service to the special municipalities of Bonaire, St. Eustatius and Saba. In June 2013, he was appointed to the Council of Advice of Aruba. In April 2015 Goedgedrag was appointed to mediate between the Scholengemeenschap Bonaire (educational board) and the Ministry of Education, Culture and Science, after disputes following a critical report by education inspectors. In June 2020 he was appointed to sit on a Dutch special committee to promote dialogue about the country's history in slavery and the slave trade and to promote reconciliation. Goedgedrag left the State Council in December 2021.

In March 2025 Goedgedrag chaired the first meeting of the Caribbean Netherlands Healthcare Commission. The body was working to implement recommendations made by the State Secretary for Health, Welfare and Sport and to bring the level of healthcare in the islands up to the standards of the European part of the Netherlands. The report of the commission was submitted to the Dutch House of Representatives in April 2026 and made recommendations for thorough reforms to the administration of healthcare in the Caribbean Netherlands. In August 2025 Goedgedrag was appointed to chair the Vishon 2050 Commission, which aimed to establish a masterplan for Bonaire to 2050.

Political offices
Preceded by George Albert Soliana	Lieutenant Governor of Bonaire; 1992–1998	Succeeded by Richard Nelson Hart
Preceded by Jaime Saleh	Governor of the Netherlands Antilles; 2002–2010	Succeeded by Position abolished
Preceded by Position established	Governor of Curaçao; 2010–2012	Succeeded by Adèle van der Pluijm-Vrede; Acting
