= Daniel Hodge =

Former prime minister of Curaçao

3rd Prime Minister of Curaçao
- In office 31 December 2012 – 7 June 2013
- Monarchs: Beatrix; Willem-Alexander
- Governor: Adèle van der Pluijm-Vrede (acting)
- Preceded by: Stanley Betrian
- Succeeded by: Ivar Asjes

Personal details
- Born: 23 October 1959 (age 66)

Daniel Robert Hodge (born 23 October 1959) is a Curaçaoan politician who served as the third Prime Minister of Curaçao from December 2012 to June 2013. Hodge, who was formerly the director of the Postspaarbank Curaçao, later became the leader of Partido Antia Restruktura (Real Alternative Party) after his resignation as the prime minister. In early 2025, he returned to politics and took over as the new leader of the Democratic Party.

== Early life and career ==
Daniel Robert Hodge was born on 23 October 1959. After completing his schooling in Curacao, he obtained a diploma from Maria Immaculata Lyceum (Mary Immaculate High School) in 1978. He attended college in Netherlands, and graduated with a degree in business administration from the Tilburg University in 1984. In 1987, he obtained his master's degree in business administration from Erasmus University at Rotterdam.

Hodge returned to Curacao and took up a financial analyst position at Kodela. He later joined Aqualectra, before moving on to take up a position as an investment office at MCB bank in 1989, where he worked till 1997. He worked at the Giro Bank from 1997 to 2002, before taking up a role at Postspaarbank Curaçao (Post Savings Bank). He later became the director of Postspaarbank and later as the director of the business association Vereniging Bedrijfsleven Curaçao (Curaçao Business Association).

== Political career ==
Hodge was sworn in as the Prime Minister of Curaçao on 31 December 2012 by Governor Adèle van der Pluijm-Vrede. He represented the Pueblo Soberano (Sovereign People) party, and succeeded Stanley Betrian, who led an interim government in the last months of 2012.

On 27 March 2013, Hodge resigned as the prime minister along with his cabinet. He continued to lead the government in a demissionary capacity until a new cabinet was formed on 7 June 2013.

After his resignation as the prime minister, Hodge was elected as the new leader of the Partido Antia Restruktura (Real Alternative Party) on 25 June 2013, and briefly served in the post. After a hiatus, he returned as the chairman of the Democratic Party, and was elected as its leader in January 2025.

Political offices
Preceded by Stanley Betrian	Prime Minister of Curaçao; 2012–2013	Succeeded by Ivar Asjes
