= C93 (Curaçao) =

Political party in Curaçao

C93 was a political party in Curaçao, the former Netherlands Antilles. At the 2002 Netherlands Antilles general election, the party won 3.55% of the popular vote of Curaçao and none of the 14 Curaçao-seats in the Estates of the Netherlands Antilles. The party was dissolved in 2006.
