= Work for Curaçao =

Work for Curaçao Trabou pa Kòrsou
- Dutch name: Werk voor Curaçao
- Leader: Rennox Calmes
- Founder: Rennox Calmes
- Founded: October 2020
- Headquarters: Willemstad
- Political position: Big tent
- Colours: Brown
- Estates of Curaçao: 1 / 21

Work for Curaçao (Dutch: Werk voor Curaçao; Papiamento: Trabou pa Kòrsou, TPK) is a political party in Curaçao. The party was founded in October 2020 as a splinter from various parties, running candidates who were formerly from the National People's Party, Partido Inovashon Nashonal, Workers' Liberation Front, and People's Crusade Labour Party, by former police officer and member of the Parliament of Curaçao, Rennox Calmes.

== History ==
In 2019, during Rennox Calmes' tenure as a member of Parliament, demands were made by fellow Parliament member Miro Amparo dos Santos to investigate Calmes' political activities. The demands were made after Calmes was sent to visit The Netherlands for a working visit on behalf of the Parliament of Curaçao, but instead traveled to London. The party became the subject of controversy after rumors had circulated that Calmes had threatened to break away from the party and serve as an independent in parliament. Both the party and Calmes denied these allegations.

The party ran in the 2021 Curaçao general election, initially fielding twenty-nine candidates; however, one candidate, Almeir Godett, was shot and killed during a familial dispute. Despite this, Godett was not removed from the list of candidates, and it was possible to vote for him during the race. Godett received 427 votes. The Supreme Electoral Council of Curaçao declared that the votes for Godett would be transferred to the party itself, not to him. During the election, TPK received 4,411 votes, or 5.20% of the votes for Parliament, resulting in one seat being won by the party.
