= Ivar Asjes =

Curaçaoan politician

His Excellency Ivar Asjes
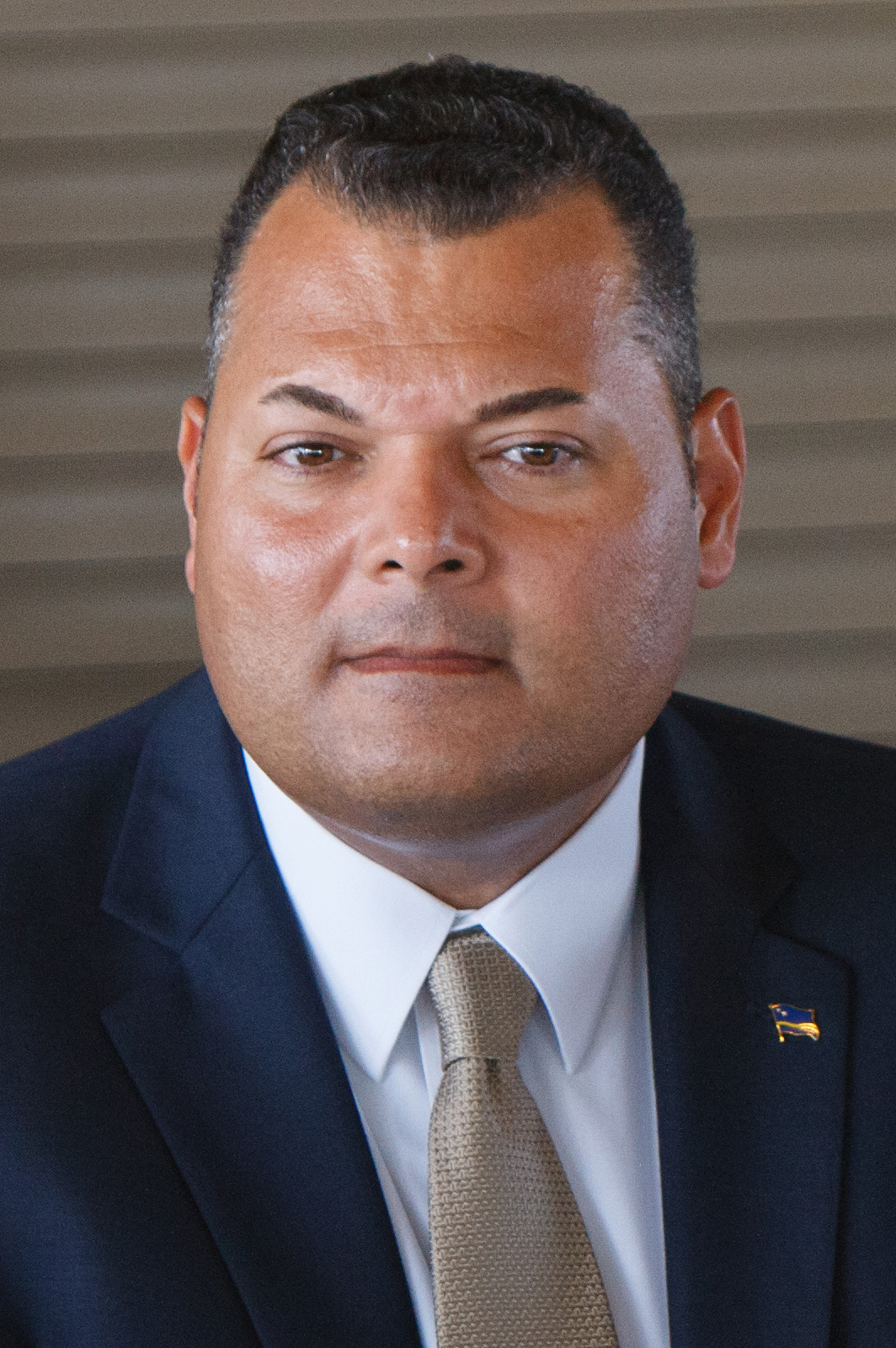

4th Prime Minister of Curaçao
- In office 7 June 2013 – 31 August 2015
- Monarch: Willem-Alexander
- Governor: Adèle van der Pluijm-Vrede (acting); Lucille George-Wout
- Preceded by: Daniel Hodge
- Succeeded by: Ben Whiteman

Leader of Pueblo Soberano (pro tempore)
- In office 5 May 2013 – 31 August 2015
- Preceded by: Helmin Wiels
- Succeeded by: Ben Whiteman (pro tempore)

Personal details
- Born: 16 September 1970 (age 55) Rotterdam, Netherlands
- Party: Pueblo Soberano

Ivar Onno Odwin Asjes (born 16 September 1970) is a Curaçaoan politician who served as the fourth prime minister of Curaçao from 7 June 2013 to 31 August 2015. He resigned after losing a vote of no-confidence. before becoming prime minister, Asjes was a member of the Parliament of Curaçao (2010–2013) and its predecessor and the Island Council of Curaçao.

Political offices
Preceded by Daniel Hodge	Prime Minister of Curaçao; 2013–2015	Succeeded by Ben Whiteman
