= Helmin Wiels =

Curaçao politician (1958–2013)

Leader of Sovereign People in the Estates of Curaçao
- In office 10 October 2010 – 5 May 2013

Personal details
- Born: Helmin Magno Wiels; 9 December 1958 Westpunt, Curaçao.
- Died: 5 May 2013 (aged 54) Marie Pompoen Beach, Curaçao.
- Party: Sovereign People
- Spouse: Divorced
- Children: 2

Helmin Magno Wiels (9 December 1958 – 5 May 2013) was a leftist politician, anti-corruption activist and social worker from Curaçao. He served as chairman of Sovereign People (the largest political party in the Estates after the October 2012 election) and was a vocal campaigner for Curaçao's independence from the Kingdom of the Netherlands.

Wiels was assassinated on 5 May 2013 following earlier written threats on his life. Elvis Kuwas, a hitman for the "No Limit Soldiers" drugs gang that had planned the assassination, was found guilty of three counts of murder (including that of Wiels) and was sentenced to life imprisonment in August 2014.

== Biography ==
Wiels was born on 9 December 1958 into a lower-middle-class family from Westpunt. He became a social worker and radio maker before joining Niun paso atras (Papiamento for "No step backwards") and constituting Aliansa Sivil (Civil Alliance). In 2005, he founded Sovereign People (Pueblo Soberano), a leftist political party that won the popular vote in the October 2012 elections.

Associated Press news reports characterized Wiels’ outspoken rhetorical style as charismatic but sometimes divisive. He was a proponent of Curaçao’s independence, a promoter of stronger ties with its South American neighbors, and wanted to stop U.S. Air Force surveillance planes from using Willemstad's Airport as a base while participating in multinational counter-drug missions in the Caribbean. He also asserted that, if Curaçao ever achieves its full independence, it must declare Papiamento, English and Spanish as its official languages because "Dutch is a dead language, the same as Greek or Latin".

=== Assassination ===
According to Nelson Navarro, Minister of Justice at the time of Wiels' assassination, the party leader had received several death threats and the government was assisting him with security personnel but on 5 May 2013, Wiels had sent the bodyguard home and went to Marie Pompoen Beach, located on the eastern side of the island. Around 5 pm, while he was drinking a beer and socializing at the pier, two men approached him and shot him five times before fleeing the scene in a gold-colored car. His body fell face down and lay in the sand until the paramedics arrived and pronounced him dead.

In the days that followed his assassination, the local authorities pursued several lines of inquiry. One of them, suggested by Donald Balentina –Wiels' successor as leader of Pueblo Soberano– was a political vendetta, as Wiels constantly made anti-corruption speeches and had recently denounced the sale of Robbie’s Lottery numbers through UTS, a public telecommunications company with no license to do so (in the process, making them available to minors and allegedly concentrating the profits at an offshore bank in Sint Maarten). Other politicians, such as Ronald Plasterk, Minister of the Interior and Kingdom Relations of the Netherlands, were hesitant to blame Wiels' murder on the recent scandal, claiming that “it could also be because of the way he took on corruption, or the drugs world or something else rotten.”

Two brothers were arrested after a threatening movie surfaced on YouTube following the murder, stating that "Wiels was the first victim and more blood would be shed", but both were released after two weeks. Eventually, the police arrested Elvis Kuwas alias "Monster", a gunman for the "No Limit Soldiers" drug gang of the Koraalspecht district, which had planned the execution and paid him €23,000 to carry it out. In late August 2014, Kuwas was sentenced to life imprisonment, and the ruling was upheld by the Supreme Court of the Netherlands in July 2016.
