= Movement for the Future of Curaçao =

Movement for the Future of Curaçao Movementu Futuro Kòrsou
- Dutch name: Beweging voor de Toekomst van Curaçao
- Leader: Gilmar Pisas
- Founder: Gerrit Schotte
- Founded: 9 July 2010
- Ideology: Curaçao autonomy
- Political position: Centre to centre-right
- Colours: Blue, white
- Estates of Curaçao: 13 / 21

Website
- mfk.cw

The Movement for the Future of Curaçao (Dutch: Beweging voor de Toekomst van Curaçao, Papiamento: Movementu Futuro Kòrsou, MFK) is a political party in Curaçao, founded by Gerrit Schotte in 2010, which has 13 of the 21 seats in the Parliament of Curaçao after the 2025 Curaçao election.

The party entered the island council of Curaçao (which became the Estates of Curaçao on 10 October 2010) after the general election of 27 August 2010 as the second largest party, winning 5 of 21 seats. Its leader Gerrit Schotte became the first Prime Minister of Curaçao in a coalition cabinet of MFK, PS and MAN. In March 2017 Gilmar Pisas became the second MFK prime minister of Curaçao.

In April 2017 party leader Schotte stated he wished to obtain independence for Curaçao. This was later walked back by Gilmar Pisas, Schotte's successor as leader.

== Election results ==
Election	Leader	Votes	%	Seats	+/–	Government
2010	Gerrit Schotte	15,953	21.46 (#2)	5 / 21	▲5	Coalition
2012	Gerrit Schotte	18,450	21.21 (#2)	5 / 21	Steady	Opposition
2016	Gerrit Schotte	12,671	16.01 (#2)	4 / 21	▼1	Opposition
2017	Gerrit Schotte	15,710	19.92 (#3)	5 / 21	▲1	Opposition
2021	Gilmar Pisas	23,559	27.76 (#1)	9 / 21	▲4	Coalition
2025	Gilmar Pisas	41,638	55.22 (#1)	13 / 21	▲4	Majority
