= Real Alternative Party =

Political party

Real Alternative Party Partido Alternativa Real
- Abbreviation: PAR
- Leader: Quincy Girigorie
- Founded: 1993
- Headquarters: Parera, Willemstad
- Ideology: Liberalism; Christian democracy
- Political position: Centre
- Colours: Yellow
- Slogan: Eksperiensia i stabilidat ("Experience and stability")
- Parliament of Curaçao: 2 / 21

Website
- www.par.cw

The Real Alternative Party (Papiamento: Partido Alternativa Real, PAR), formerly the Party for the Restructured Antilles (Papiamento: Partido Antiá Restrukturá; Dutch: Partij voor Geherstructureerde Antillen) until 2016, is a political party in Curaçao. With two seats, the party is the third largest party in the Parliament of Curaçao, following the 2025 elections.

== Netherlands Antilles ==
The party was formed in the wake of constitutional referendums held on the islands in the Netherlands Antilles in 1993, when a majority had voted against the dissolution of the Netherlands Antilles. At the 2002 Netherlands Antilles general election, the party won 20.6% of the popular vote and 4 of the 14 seats in the Curaçao constituency in the 22-seat Parliament of the Netherlands Antilles. Its leader Etiënne Ys became prime minister of the Netherlands Antilles. When the party won five and six seats respectively in the Netherlands Antilles general election in 2006 and 2010, its leader Emily de Jongh-Elhage became the last Prime Minister of the Netherlands Antilles.

In the island council of the island territory of Curaçao the party won five and seven seats respectively. In the last island council the party obtained 8 of the 21 seats. The island council continued as Parliament of Curaçao upon the dissolution of the Netherlands Antilles in October 2010.

== Curaçao ==
On the formation of the second Whiteman cabinet in November 2015, the PAR joined the government for the first time in five years. PAR remained part of the government until December 2016.

== Election results ==
Election	Votes	%	Seats	+/–	Position	Government
1995	24,055	34.2	8 / 21	▲8	▲1st	Coalition
1999	15,948	22.6	5 / 21	▼3	1st	Coalition
2003	13,710	20.4	5 / 21	0	▼2nd	Opposition
2007	20,862	28.0	7 / 21	▲2	▲1st	Coalition
2010	22,474	30.0	8 / 21	▲1	1st	Opposition
2012	17,179	19.7	4 / 21	▼4	▼3rd	Opposition
2016	11,949	15.1	4 / 21	0	3rd	Coalition
2017	18,362	23.2	6 / 21	▲2	▲1st	Coalition
2021	11,778	13.9	4 / 21	▼2	▼2nd	Opposition
2025	7,561	10.0	2 / 21	▼2	▼3rd	Opposition
