= Parliament of Curaçao =

Legislature of Curaçao

Parliament of Curaçao Parlamento di Kòrsou
- 3rd Curaçaoan Parliament

Type
- Type: Unicameral

History
- Founded: 10 October 2010

Leadership
- Monarch: King Willem-Alexander
- Governor: Mauritsz de Kort
- Speaker: Fergino Brownbill, MFK since 11 May 2025

Structure
- Seats: 21
- Political groups: Government (13): MFK (13); Opposition (8): PNP (4); PAR (2); MAN (2)
- Length of term: 4 years

Elections
- Voting system: Party-list proportional representation
- Last election: 21 March 2025

Motto
- Latin: Cum lege libertas (Freedom under the law)

Meeting place
- Willemstad

Website
- www.parlamento.cw

The Parliament of Curaçao (Papiamento: Parlamento di Kòrsou), also known as the Estates of Curaçao (Dutch: Staten van Curaçao), is the unicameral legislative body of the country of Curaçao. It consists of 21 members, elected by proportional representation for a four-year term. The first Parliament was installed on 10 October 2010, following the dissolution of the Netherlands Antilles, and consisted of the members of the island council elected on 27 August 2010. The current Parliament was installed on 11 May 2025, following the general election held on 21 March 2025.

The first Speaker of the Parliament was Ivar Asjes (Pueblo Soberano), while Amerigo Thodé (Movementu Futuro Korsou) was the Deputy Speaker.

The incumbent Speaker of Parliament is Fergino Brownbill.

== Speakers ==
Speaker	Deputy Speaker	Period
Ivar Asjes (PS)	Amerigo Thodé (MFK)	2010–2012
Dean Rozier (Independent, former MFK)	Anthony Godett (FOL)	2012
Amerigo Thodé (MFK)	Jaime Córdoba (PS)	2012
Marcolino Franco (PAIS)	Jaime Córdoba (PS)	2012–2015
Marcolino Franco (PAIS)	Humphrey Davelaar (PNP)	2015–2016
Humphrey Davelaar (PNP)	Jaime Córdoba (PS)	2016–2017
Giselle McWilliam (MAN)	Marilyn Alcalá-Wallé (PAR)	2017
Gilmar Pisas (MFK)	Norberto Ribeiro (KdnT)	2017
Amerigo Thodé (MFK)	Eduard Braam	2017
William Millerson (PAR)	Giselle McWilliam (Partido MAN)	11 May 2017 – 3 June 2020
Ana-Maria Pauletta (PAR)	Giselle McWilliam (Partido MAN)	3 June 2020 – 11 May 2021
Charetti America-Francisca (MFK)	Ruthmilda Larmonie-Cecilia (PNP)	11 May 2021 – 7 April 2025
Fergino Brownbill (MFK)	Ramón Yung	11 May 2025 – present

== 2025 general election ==
Party	Votes	%	Seats	+/–
Movement for the Future of Curaçao	41,638	55.22	13	+4
National People's Party	12,297	16.31	4	0
Real Alternative Party	7,561	10.03	2	–2
Partido MAN-Partido Inovashon Nashonal	6,378	8.46	2	0
Curaçao is the Best	2,526	3.35	0	–1
Movementu Kousa Promé	1,846	2.45	0	New
Work for Curaçao	1,616	2.14	0	–1
Mihó Kòrsou	1,540	2.04	0	New
Total	75,402	100.00	21	–
Valid votes	75,402	98.00		
Invalid votes	1,302	1.69		
Blank votes	233	0.30		
Total votes	76,937	100.00		
Source: KSE

== Building ==
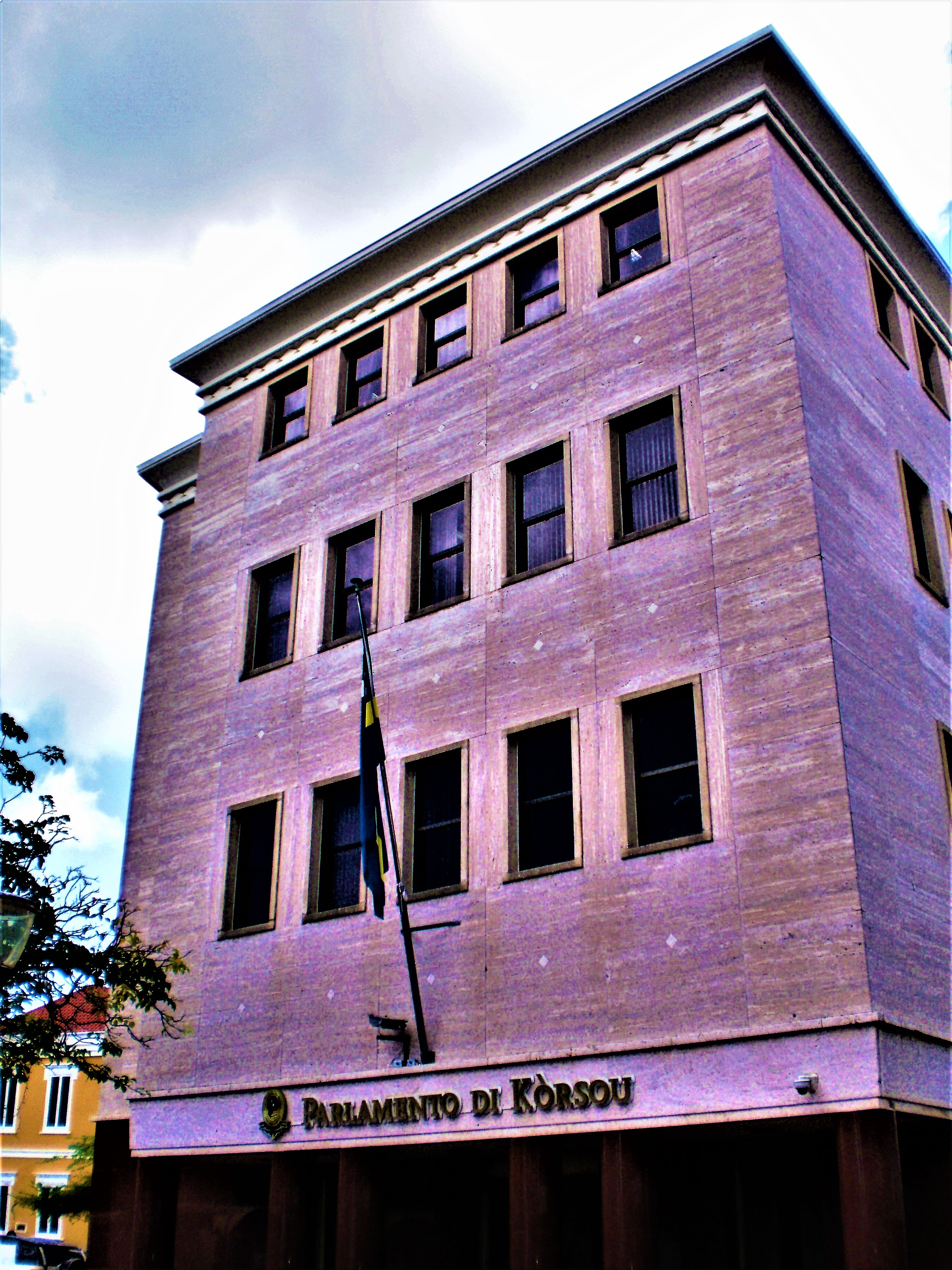
Statengebouw Curaçao

The parliament is housed in the Statengebouw on the Julianaplein in Punda. The building has 21 steps representing the 21 seats. Between 2010 and 2014, the parliament met in the building of the Island Council on Ansinghstraat, because the building was being renovated.
