= Cunningham =

Origin
- Region of origin: Cunninghame, Scotland

Other names
- Variant forms: Coningham, Conyngham, Cuningham, Cuninghame, Cunninghame

Cunningham is a surname of Scottish origin, see Clan Cunningham.

== Notable people sharing this surname ==
=== A–C ===
- Aaron Cunningham (born 1986), American baseball player
- Abe Cunningham (born 1973), American drummer
- Adrian Cunningham (born 1960), Australian archivist
- Alan Cunningham, British Second World War general
- Alexander Cunningham (1814–1893), British archaeologist, father of the Archaeological Survey of India
- Alexander Cunningham, 1st Earl of Glencairn (1426–1488), a Scottish nobleman
- Alexander Cunningham, 5th Earl of Glencairn (died 1574), a Scottish nobleman and covenanter
- Alfred Austell Cunningham, American aviation pioneer
- Allan Cunningham (disambiguation) or Allen Cunningham, several people
- Andrew Cunningham, 1st Viscount Cunningham of Hyndhope, British Second World War admiral
- Andrew Cunningham (disambiguation) or Andy Cunningham, several people
- Archibald Cunningham (1879–1915), Scottish footballer
- Bert Cunningham (1865–1962), American baseball player
- Bertram Cunningham, British Anglican priest and academic
- Bill Cunningham (disambiguation), several people
- Bill Cunningham (talk show host), American radio talk show host
- Billy Cunningham, American basketball player and coach
- Birgit Cunningham, Anglo-American activist
- Bob Cunningham (disambiguation), several people
- Briggs Cunningham, American racing driver and team owner, sports car designer and manufacturer
- Brysson Cunningham, Scottish harbour engineer and author on dock and harbour engineering and operation
- Cade Cunningham (born 2001), American basketball player
- Cal Cunningham (born 1973), Democratic state senator in North Carolina
- Caleb Cunningham (born 2005), American football player
- Cara Cunningham (born 1987), American singer-songwriter
- Charles Cunningham (disambiguation), several people, including:
  - Charles Cunningham, Royal Navy admiral
  - Charles Milton Cunningham, American newspaper editor and politician
- Chris Cunningham, British director and video artist
- Christian Cunningham (born 1997), American basketball player in the Israeli Basketball Premier League
- Clare Cunningham (athlete), British athlete
- Claire Cunningham, British choreographer
- Colin Cunningham (swimmer), British swimmer

=== D–J ===
- Daniel John Cunningham, Scottish anatomist
- Darryl Cunningham, English cartoonist
- Darren J. Cunningham, known professionally as Actress, British electronic music producer
- Darren Edward Cunningham, Scottish Ice Hockey Player
- David Cunningham (disambiguation), several people
- David Loren Cunningham, film producer
- Dominick Cunningham (born 1995), British artistic gymnast
- Donnell L. Cunningham (1866–1947), chief justice of the Arizona Supreme Court
- Duke Cunningham (1941–2025), American convicted politician
- Ebenezer Cunningham, British mathematician
- Edward Francis Cunningham, Scottish painter
- Edwin Cunningham (disambiguation), several people
- Elaine Cunningham, American fantasy and science-fiction author
- Elmer T. Cunningham, American entrepreneur and businessman, specializing in vacuum tubes and radio manufacturing
- E. V. Cunningham, pseudonym of Howard Fast, an American writer
- Francine Cunningham, Indigenous writer, artist, and educator
- Francis Cunningham (painter)
- Gary Cunningham (born 1940/1941), American basketball coach and athletic director
- George Godfrey Cunningham (c. 1802–1860), Scottish writer
- Glenn Cunningham (disambiguation), several people
- Gordon Cunningham (golfer), Scottish golfer
- Graeme Cunningham (cricketer), Australian cricketer
- Graeme Cunningham (Scottish footballer), Scottish footballer
- Harry Cunningham (disambiguation), several people
- Hugh Cunningham (disambiguation), several people
- Ian Cunningham, American football executive and former player
- Imogen Cunningham (1883–1976), American photographer
- J. V. Cunningham, American poet
- Jack Cunningham (disambiguation), several people
- James Cunningham (disambiguation), several people
- Jason D. Cunningham, US Air Force pararescue medic
- Jason Cunningham, English boxer
- Jean Wooden Cunningham, American politician and lawyer
- Jeff Cunningham, American association football player
- Jim Cunningham (disambiguation), several people
- John Cunningham (disambiguation) or Johnny Cunningham, several people
- Joseph Cunningham (disambiguation) or Joe Cunningham, several people

=== K–Z ===
- Kayson Cunningham (born 2006), American baseball player
- Keiron Cunningham, British rugby league player
- Kenny Cunningham, Irish footballer
- Korey Cunningham (1995–2024), American football player
- Kristan Cunningham, American interior designer and television personality
- Larry Cunningham (1938–2012), Irish country music singer
- Larry Cunningham (1951–2019), American R&B singer, member of the vocal group The Floaters
- Laurie Cunningham, English former footballer
- Leland Cunningham, American astronomer and electronic computing authority
- Liam Cunningham, an Irish actor
- Loren Cunningham (1935–2023), American-born missions statesman and founder of Youth With A Mission
- Malik Cunningham (born 1998), American football player
- Marta Cunningham (1869–1937), American-born European-based soprano-singer and philanthropist
- Martha Jane Cunningham (1856–1916), Canadian missionary educator in Japan
- Mary Ann Cunningham (1841–1930), Canadian temperance activist
- Melvin Cunningham (born 1973), American football player
- Merce Cunningham (1919–2009), American choreographer
- Michael Cunningham, American novelist, author of The Hours
- Michael R. Cunningham, Chancellor National University System
- Milton Joseph Cunningham, American politician
- Minnie Fisher Cunningham, American suffrage politician
- Myrna Cunningham, Miskita feminist and indigenous rights activist from Nicaragua
- Owen Cunningham, Australian rugby league footballer
- Patrick Cunningham (politician) (1878–1960), Irish politician
- Paul Cunningham (disambiguation), several people
- Phil Cunningham (folk musician), Scottish accordionist with the folk group Silly Wizard
- Phil Cunningham (rock musician), English musician
- Ralph E. Cunningham Jr. (1925–2007), American politician
- Randall Duke Cunningham (1941–2025), American convicted politician
- Randall Cunningham, American football player
- Redmond Cunningham, Irish officer in the British Army
- Richie Cunningham (American football) (born 1970), American football placekicker
- Robert Cunningham (disambiguation), any of several people
- Ross Cunningham, Scottish footballer
- Roy Cunningham, the defendant in R v Cunningham
- Samuel Cunningham (born 1989), Thai footballer
- Scott Cunningham (1956–1993), American writer
- Sean S. Cunningham, film producer and director
- Sederrik Cunningham, American football player
- Sophie Cunningham (born 1996), American basketball player
- Sophie Cunningham (writer) (born 1963), Australian writer and editor
- Stacey Cunningham, 67th President of the New York Stock Exchange
- Sumner Archibald Cunningham (1843–1913), American Confederate veteran and newspaper editor
- Tony Cunningham (footballer), Jamaican former footballer
- Timothy J. Cunningham (1982–2018), American epidemiologist
- Walter Cunningham (1932–2023), American astronaut, Apollo 7 crew member
- Walterina Cunningham (died 1837), Scottish author and poet
- Wade Cunningham, New Zealand racing driver
- Ward Cunningham, American computer programmer, developer of the first wiki
- William Cunningham (disambiguation), several people
- Zach Cunningham (born 1994), American football player

== Notable fictional characters sharing this surname ==
- Max Cunningham, character from Hollyoaks
- Tom Cunningham, also a character from Hollyoaks
- The Cunningham family from Happy Days:
  - Howard Cunningham, father
  - Marion Cunningham, mother
  - Chuck Cunningham, first son that was written out of the show after the second season.
  - Richie Cunningham, second son and also the series' original lead character
  - Joanie Cunningham, younger daughter
- Rebecca Cunningham and her daughter Molly Cunningham from TaleSpin
- The Cunningham family in To Kill a Mockingbird by Harper Lee
- Randy Cunningham, the titular protagonist of the Disney series Randy Cunningham: 9th Grade Ninja
- Mr and Alec Cunningham in the Sherlock Holmes story "The Adventure of the Reigate Squire"

== Other uses of the Cunningham name ==
- Cunningham automobile
- Cunningham-Hall Aircraft Corporation (1928–1948), aircraft manufacturer in Rochester, New York
- James Cunningham, Son and Company (1882–1936), carriage and auto company in Rochester, New York
