= John Francis Cunningham =

John Francis Cunningham may refer to:

- John Francis Cunningham (bishop) (1842–1919), Irish-born prelate of the Roman Catholic Church
- John Francis Cunningham (surgeon) (1875–1932), British ophthalmic surgeon

== See also ==
- John Cunningham (disambiguation)
