= Graeme Cunningham =

Graeme Cunningham may refer to:

- Graeme Cunningham (cricketer) (born 1975), Australian cricketer
- Graeme Cunningham (footballer) (1922–?), Scottish amateur footballer
