= J. Cunningham =

J. Cunningham may refer to:

- James Vincent Cunningham (1911 – 1985) American poet, writing under the initials J. V. Cunningham
- J. Cunningham (rugby)
- Joy Cunningham, British tennis player – see 1935 Wimbledon Championships – Women's Singles

See also Cunningham
