= General Cunningham =

General Cunningham may refer to:

- Alan Cunningham (1887–1983), British Army general
- Alexander Cunningham (1814–1893), British Army major general
- Case Cunningham (fl. 1990s–2020s), U.S. Air Force major general
- Charles J. Cunningham (born 1932), U.S. Air Force lieutenant general
- Douglas Gordon Cunningham (1908–1992), Canadian Forces brigadier general
- Hugh Cunningham (British Army officer) (1921–2019), British Army lieutenant general
- James A. Cunningham (1830–1892), Union Army brevet brigadier general
- Julian Cunningham (1893–1972), U.S. Army major general
- William Cunningham (lawyer) (1883–1959), New Zealand Military Forces major general
- William Cunningham, 13th Earl of Glencairn (died 1775), British Army general

== See also ==
- Robert Cuninghame, 1st Baron Rossmore (1726–1801), British Army general
