= James Cunningham =

James or Jim Cunningham may refer to:

== Politics ==
- James Cunningham (Australian politician) (1879–1943), Australian politician and President of the Senate
- Jim Cunningham (politician) (born 1941), Labour MP in the United Kingdom
- James Cunningham (Canadian politician) (1834–1925), former member of the Canadian House of Commons from British Columbia
- James Cunningham (Manitoba politician) (died 1915), former member of the Legislative Assembly of Manitoba
- James Bertram Cunningham (1872–?), politician in the Canadian province of Ontario
- James B. Cunningham (born 1952), American diplomat, formerly the acting US ambassador to the UN
- James E. Cunningham (1916–1992), member of the California legislature
- James Glencairn Cunningham (1903–1996), Ulster Unionist Party Senator
- Cal Cunningham (James Calvin Cunningham, III, born 1973), Democratic state senator in North Carolina

== Sports ==
- James Cunningham (footballer) (1885–1959), Scottish footballer for St Mirren, Kilmarnock, Cowdenbeath
- Jim Cunningham (American football) (born 1939), former NFL running back for the Washington Redskins
- Jim Cunningham (basketball) (1935–1991), college basketball player at Fordham University
- Jim Cunningham (ice hockey) (1956–2011), ice hockey player in the National Hockey League
- Jimmy Cunningham (born 1973), former return specialist and wide receiver in the Canadian Football League and the XFL
- James Cunningham (rugby league) (born 1994), rugby league footballer

== Other ==
- James Cunningham, 1838 founder of James Cunningham, Son and Company, coach and later automobile maker
- James Cunningham, 7th Earl of Glencairn (1552–1630), Scottish peer and member of the Privy Council of Scotland
- James Cunningham, 14th Earl of Glencairn (1749–1791), Scottish nobleman
- James Cunningham (bishop) (1910–1974), Roman Catholic Bishop of Hexham and Newcastle
- James Cunningham (botanist), Scottish botanist
- James Cunningham (comedian) (born 1973/74), Canadian comedian host of Food Network Canada's Eat St.
- James Cunningham (director) (born 1973), New Zealand film director
- James A. Cunningham (1830–1892), officer in the Union Army during the American Civil War
- James D. Cunningham (1887–1963), American manufacturer
- James S. Cunningham (1840–1921), Union Army soldier and Medal of Honor recipient
- J. V. Cunningham (1911–1985), American poet, literary critic, and teacher

== Characters ==
- James Cunningham (Coronation Street), in the soap opera Coronation Street
- Jim Cunningham, in the film Donnie Darko
