= Harry Cunningham =

Harry Cunningham may refer to:

- Harry B. Cunningham (1907–1992), American businessman
- Harry Cunningham (activist) (1891–1938), Irish-American activist
- Harry Cunningham (baseball), Negro league baseball player
- Harry Cunningham (footballer) (born 1993), Australian Rules footballer
- Peerie Cunningham (Henry/Harry Cunningham, 1898–1972), Scottish footballer for Ayr United and Kilmarnock
- Harry Cunningham (swimmer) (1910–?), Scottish swimmer
- Harry Cunningham, a principal character in the Silent Witness British television series

== See also ==
- Henry Cunningham (c. 1678–1736), Scottish politician
- Henry Cunningham (knight), Scottish noble
- H. S. Cunningham (Henry Stewart Cunningham, 1832–1920), British lawyer and writer
