= Garrey Dawson =

British chef

Garrey Dawson is a British chef who has appeared on television in the BBC programme Ready Steady Cook.

== Career ==
Dawson started his career at Pennyhill Park Hotel in Bagshot, Surrey. Since then he has worked at Cliveden Hotel & Spa and at Heston Blumenthal's The Fat Duck restaurant, where he helped Blumenthal earn the restaurant a three Michelin star rating. In 2004, he became head chef at the Riverside Brasserie restaurant in Bray, buying out Blumenthal's share in the restaurant, which is also part owned by footballer Lee Dixon. He also worked on a consultative basis with establishments in and around the Berkshire area, such as Secret Kitchen & Bar, which was owned by Gary Goldsmith, the Princess of Wales's uncle.

Dawson left England for Denmark, where he is the manager of Henne Kirkeby Kro, a two-Michelin star inn.

In 2006, Dawson was invited to appear on Ready Steady Cook, where he has become a regular.
