= Nolda Römer-Kenepa =

Nolda Cira Römer-Kenepa

Acting Governor of Curaçao
- In office 25 June 2013 – 3 June 2019
- Preceded by: Adèle van der Pluijm-Vrede
- Succeeded by: Michèle Russel-Capriles

Personal details
- Born: 3 January 1953 (age 73) Willemstad, Netherlands
- Occupation: Archivist

Nolda Cira Römer-Kenepa (born 3 January 1953) is a Dutch historian and archivist. She served as acting governor (Note: The acting governor of Curaçao replaces the governor in the event of illness or absence, and replaces the governor after resignation or death.) of Curaçao from 2013 to 2019.

== Early years ==
Nolda Cira Kenepa was born in Willemstad, Curaçao, Netherlands, on 3 January 1953. Her parents were Bicente Paulo Kenepa and Wilhelmina Ramona (Nucatia) Kenepa. She studied modern history at the Vrije Universiteit Amsterdam. Her 1980 doctoral study was on Vrouwenleven op Curaçao: Laat achttiende eeuw en vroeg negentiende eeuw (Women's Lives in Curaçao: Late Eighteenth and Early Nineteenth Century). In it she was one of the first to consider the marginalization of women in Curaçao during the slave period. Enslaved women were doubly exploited due to their color and gender.

== Career ==
From 1980 to 1988 Römer-Kenepa was a history researcher at the History Archives Center in Curaçao. She qualified as a Higher Archivist from the Archiefschool, The Hague, in 1992. She was deputy director of the History Archives Center from 1980 to 1990, when she became director of the center. In 1991 she became coordinator of the working group on history in the Government Consultative Mechanism between Curaçao and the Netherlands. She became a member of the government advisory board on Curaçao monuments in 1991.

In 2013 Römer-Kenepa was decorated as a Knight in the Order of Orange-Nassau. On 25 June 2013 the Acting Governor of Curaçao, Adèle van der Pluijm-Vrede, swore in her deputy Römer-Kenepa as second acting governor at Fort Amsterdam. Römer-Kenepa was acting governor of Curaçao for six years. On 3 June 2019 the governor, Lucille George-Wout, replaced her as acting governor by Michèle Russel-Capriles.

Römer-Kenepa was a member of the executive council of CARBICA, the Caribbean regional branch of the International Council on Archives (ICA) from 1994 to 2006. She organized the International African Diaspora Congress in 2003 and the second Annual conference on the Preservation of Archives in Tropical Climates. She was host of the International Conference of the Round Table on Archives (CITRA) in Curaçao] in 2006, and from 2008 to 2012 was vice-president (CITRA) of the ICA. In November 2019 Simon Chu, Adrian Cunningham and Nolda Römer-Kenepa were awarded Fellowships by the ICA.

== Publications ==
- Römer-Kenepa, Nolda C. (1980), Vrouwenleven op Curaçao: laat achttiende eeuw en vroeg negentiende eeuw : hoofdvakskriptie "nieuwe tijd", p. 93
- Gibbes, F. E.; Römer-Kenepa, Nolda C.; Scriwanek, Max A. (1999), De bewoners van Curaçao, vijf eeuwen lief en leed 1499-1999, Stichting Curaçao 1499-1999, p. 251, ISBN 978-99904-0-327-5
- Römer-Kenepa, Nolda C. (2006), Hospital St. Elisabeth 1855 - 2005: 150 Aña Di Kuido Ku Amor, De Curaçaosche Courant, p. 119, ISBN 978-99904-0-644-3
- Römer-Kenepa, Nolda C. (2012), Brief History of Curaçao, National Archives Curaçao, p. 35, ISBN 978-99904-1-616-9
- Römer-Kenepa, Nolda C. (2013), Presidente di Parlamento di Antia Ulandes i di Kòrsou: number dos den herarkia estatal : 75 aña demokrasia parlamentario, De Curaçaosche Courant, p. 153
- Gibbes, F. E.; Römer-Kenepa, Nolda C.; Scriwanek, Maximiliaan A. (Max) (2015), De Curacaoënaar in de geschiedenis 1499 - 2010: dediká na e yu'i Kòrsou, Stichting Nationale Geschiedenis, p. 287, ISBN 978-99904-60-11-7

== Sources ==
- "Farewell to Mrs. Nolda Römer-Kenepa as acting Governor", Curaçao Chronicle
- Nolda Römer-Kenepa beëdigd (in Dutch), 25 June 2013
- Pieter Hofmann (25 June 2013), Römer-Kenepa beëdigd (in Dutch), Versgeperst.com
- Römkens, Renée (2017), Gender and Archiving: Past, Present, Future, Uitgeverij Verloren, ISBN 978-90-8704-651-4
- Simon Chu, Adrian Cunningham and Nolda Römer-Kenepa awarded ICA Fellowship, ICA, 25 November 2019
