= Paul Cunningham =

Paul Cunningham may refer to:

- Paul Cunningham (chef) (born 1969), English chef working in Denmark
- Paul Cunningham (footballer) (born 1986), New Zealand footballer
- Paul Cunningham (journalist), Irish journalist and author
- Paul Cunningham (minister) (1937–2020), minister in Church of the Nazarene
- Paul Cunningham (politician) (1890–1961), U.S. Representative from Iowa
- Paul Cunningham (songwriter) (1890–1960), American songwriter
- Paul R. Cunningham (born 1949), Jamaican American surgeon and medical educator
- Paul Cunningham (rugby union), Irish rugby union player and coach
