= Henne Kirkeby Kro =

Inn in Varde Municipality, Denmark

Coordinates: 55°43′37.15″N 08°14′32.37″E

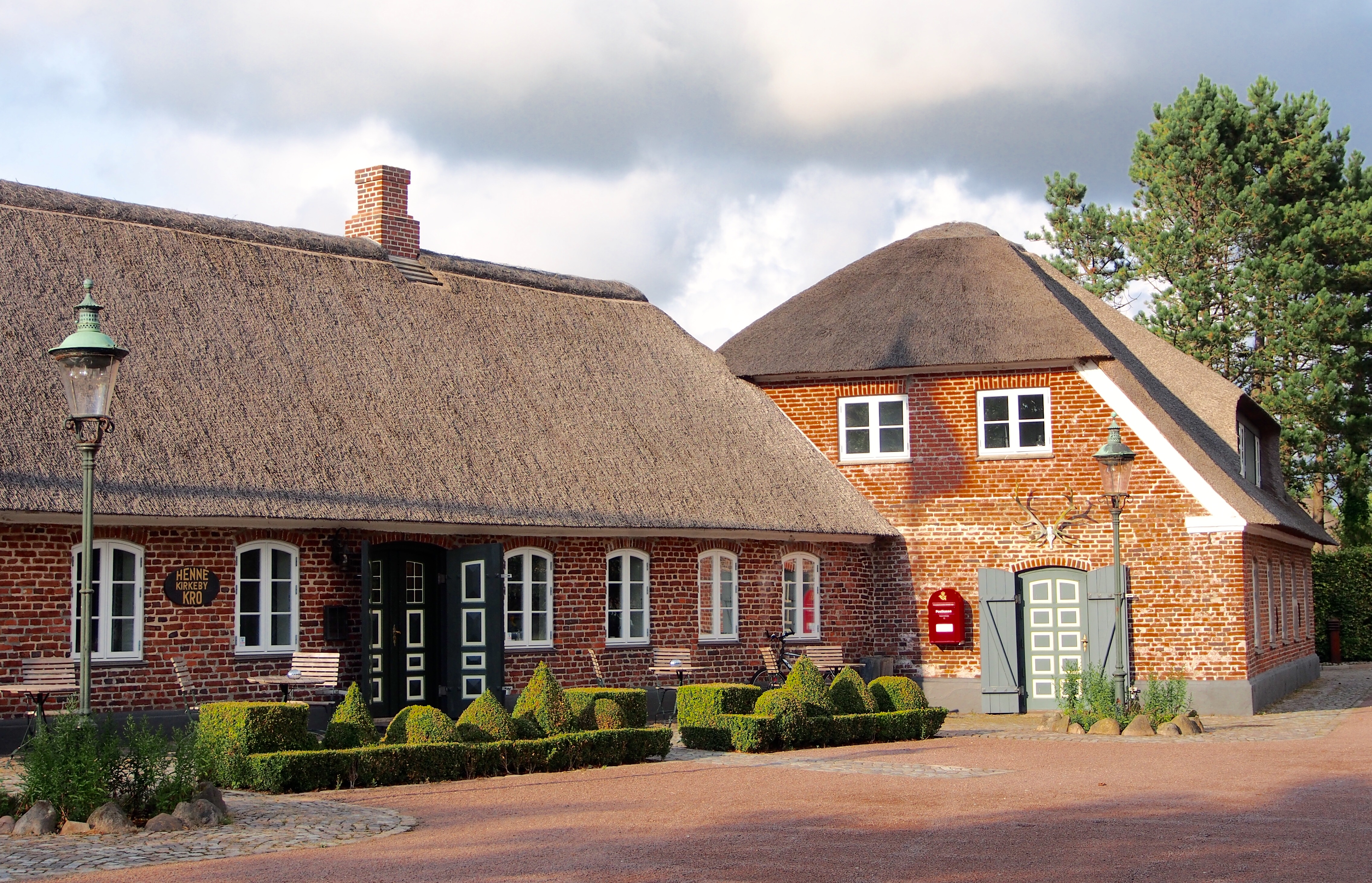
- Henne Kirkeby Kro in 2014
- Interactive map of the Henne Kirkeby Kro area

General information
- Location: Strandvejen 234, Denmark
- Year built: 1790
- Owner: Flemming Skouboe

Technical details
- Material: Brick, thatched roof

Design and construction
- Architecture firm: Tegnestuen Mejeriet A/S

Other information
- Number of rooms: 12
- Number of restaurants: 1
- Number of bars: 1
- Facilities: Garden, conference space, helipad

Website
- hennekirkebykro.dk

Restaurant information
- Manager: Garrey Dawson
- Chef: Paul Cunningham
- Rating: (Michelin Guide)
- Seating capacity: 34

Henne Kirkeby Kro is an inn (kro) in the village of Henne Kirkeby in Varde Municipality, Denmark. It was established in 1790 and since 2007 has been owned by Flemming Skouboe. The restaurant is managed by former chef Garrey Dawson and under chef Paul Cunningham was awarded a Michelin star in 2016 and a second in 2017.

== History ==
Henne Kirkeby Kro was built in 1790. The nature painter Johannes Larsen often stayed there while painting birds at the nearby lake, Filsø. It was owned for three generations by the Beck Thomsen family, most recently by the chef Hans Beck Thomsen, who ran it from 1981 until 2007, when he sold it to the Danish multi-millionaire Flemming Skouboe. Skouboe closed the business until 2009 and renovated the inn to luxury standards, with interiors in a modern, "quasi-minimalist" style including bed covers by Paul Smith, armchairs by Hans Wegner and photographs by Astrid Kruse Jensen, and later added a new guest building, Hunters' Lodge, increasing the number of guest rooms by seven to twelve. A lunch restaurant, conference space, and a helicopter landing pad have also been added.

As of 2017 the inn is owned by the Skouboe family as part of the Fænø Estate. It is open eight months a year, from Easter to mid-December, and has 22 employees during the season.

== Restaurant ==
The manager of the restaurant is Garrey Dawson, like Cunningham a British-born chef. Under chef Hans Beck Thomsen, it won the national restaurant award from Den danske Spiseguide in 2001, and the following year Jacob Justesen was chosen sommelier of the year. In 2009 Allan Poulsen was hired as chef; under him, in 2011 it again won the national award and in 2012 it was chosen Scandinavian restaurant of the year. Cunningham succeeded Poulsen as chef that year. The restaurant was awarded its first Michelin star in 2016 and a second in 2017.

The restaurant has twelve tables. The inn raises its own lamb, pigs, chicken and rabbits, and has the largest kitchen garden in Denmark, including an orchard and beehives. It also receives wild game from Skouboe's private island, Fænø, and is near Hvide Sande, the country's primary fish market. Poulsen's cuisine was new Nordic; in two dinner menus, 'Ma Cuisine' and 'Dinner chez nous', Cunningham serves an eclectic, classically based cuisine emphasising the fresh ingredients, and fish and chips on Fridays.

== Media ==
In 2015 the photographer Per Nagel published a book on the inn, Henne Kirkeby Kro: Exploring Taste and Senses.

In October 2016 the restaurant was featured in a broadcast of the documentary TV series Indefra med Anders Agger.
