= Cunninghame (surname) =

Cunninghame is a surname. Notable people with the surname include:

- John Cunninghame, Lord Cunninghame (1782–1854), Scottish lawyer
- William Cunninghame (1731–1799), Scottish tobacco merchant

== See also ==
- Cunningham
- Cuninghame
