= Simon Chu =

Simon Fook Keung Chu
- 朱福強
- Born: 25 December 1947 (age 78); Hong Kong
- Occupation: Archivist
- Known for: Proposed government archive law

Simon Fook Keung Chu (Chinese: 朱福強, born 25 December 1947) is a former Hong Kong government official who served as acting director of the Hong Kong government archives from 1999 to 2003. After his retirement, he called on Hong Kong to enact an "Archives Law" to regulate the handling of government records.

== Early years ==
Chu was born in a well-off home in Hong Kong in 1947. He father had a clerical job. He lived in Stanley, Hong Kong, in a small housing estate, and moved out of the city when he was in middle school. He lived in Canada as a teenager. In 1968 he went to the University of Western Ontario in Canada and majored in history. Later he received a master's degree in history from the University of Calgary and a master's degree in archives from the University of Western Ontario.

== Government career ==
After returning to Hong Kong from Calgary, Chu answered an advertisement for a summer job as an archivist, which matched his interest as a historian in digging through documents to find what had happened. In 1984 Chu joined the Hong Kong government as an assistant archives officer. From 1999 to 2003 he was acting head of the government archives. From 2004 to 2007, he resumed the title of director of archives and served as the director of historical archives. All the Hong Kong public records up to 1941 had been destroyed during the Japanese occupation in World War II. The government bought a collection of original documents from the British government, and Chu helped to receive and organize these documents of correspondence between Hong Kong and Britain.

Chu was the Hong Kong government's first records manager, and started the process of establishing an overall records management strategy for the government. He was able to convince the government to build a facility specifically designed to hold archives. He retired in 2007.

== Activism ==
After retiring, Chu participated in the establishment of the "Archives Action Group" to focus on the handling of public archives in Hong Kong. He also served as the president of the Hong Kong Archives Society. He criticized the Hong Kong government and public organizations for their poor archives system and requested Hong Kong to enact an "Archives Law" to protect archives by law and protect the public's right to know. In a 2009 interview he discussed the 2007 destruction of phone tapping records by the Independent Commission Against Corruption (ICAC). The surveillance commissioner Justice Woo Kwok-hing was unable to determine if the wiretapping had been legal because the records had been destroyed.

In the aftermath of the 2014 Hong Kong protests, Simon Chu, expressed concern about preservation of official documents pertaining to the protest movement, and was seeking a proxy to file an injunction on the government. He feared that the absence of a law on official archives in Hong Kong meant that senior government officials may seek to destroy all documents involving deliberations, decisions and actions taken while the protests were ongoing.

In December 2018 the Law Reform Commission recommended a law to protect public records and archives, and to ensure they could be accessed by the public. The next day Chu said the protected records should include informal emails, text messages, meeting arrangements and other records. These would have helped promote accountability in cases such as the Wang Chau housing controversy. Chu and other members of the Archives Action Group also criticized the proposal for failing to include penalties such as fines for violation of the law.

== Other activities ==
For almost twenty years Chu was secretary general of the East Asian branch of the International Council on Archives and helped to develop the UNESCO Memory of the World Programme program in the Asia Pacific region. He visited North Korea three times to train information managers and to help them form a Memory of the World committee and identify the documentary heritage of North Korea to be listed in the Memory of the World International Register.

In 2003 Chu created the International Post Graduate Certificate course in archives at the University of Hong Kong's School of Professional and Continuing Education (SPACE). Chu began to teach archives in the Department of History of the Chinese University of Hong Kong in 2007. As of 2020 Simon Chu was an Adjunct Associate Professor in that department.

In March 2019 SPACE decided to suspend the 4-year master's program of "historical archives and archives management" that Chu had been teaching. This decision was made despite the fact that the Law Reform Commission had pointed out that there was a shortage of records management professionals in Hong Kong, and this could delay implementation of the Archives Law.

== Recognition ==
In November 2019 Simon Chu, Adrian Cunningham and Nolda Römer-Kenepa were awarded Fellowships by the International Council on Archives. Also in 2019, Trudy Huskamp Peterson presented Chu the Emmett Leahy Award for outstanding contributions to the records and information management profession, the first Asian to receive the award.

== Sources ==
- Adjunct Professors and Part-time Teaching Staff, Chinese University of Hong Kong
- Christine Fung (May 2009), "Once and Still Hong Kong's Memory Keeper" (PDF), Varsity, no. 111
- 前檔案處長擬申請禁制令 阻特首銷佔領公文, hkbc.tv, archived from the original on 22 January 2015
- Holmes Chan (11 December 2018), "Civil group slams lacklustre consultation paper on Hong Kong archives law", Hong Kong Free Press
- Kanis Leung (7 December 2018), "Tapes, photos and meeting arrangements made via WhatsApp should all fall under proposed archives law, former Hong Kong official says", South China Morning Post
- Lai Hong (來鴻) (18 January 2013), "香港急需填補的大「黑洞」 (The big "black hole" Hong Kong needs to fill)", BBC Chinese Edition (in Chinese)
- Li, Kaixin (黎,凱欣) (2011-10-25), "前檔案處長朱福強 : 失憶城市沒將來", U Magazine (in Chinese), archived from the original on 2019-03-16
- Simon Chu, Adrian Cunningham and Nolda Römer-Kenepa awarded ICA Fellowship, ICA, 25 November 2019
- Simon Chu Fuqiang (6 December 2018), "檔案法與公開資料法應同時立法並設刑事罰則 (The Archives Law and the Open Information Law should be enacted at the same time and include criminal penalties)", RTHK, archived from the original on 2018-12-07
- Simon Fook‐Keung Chu Receives the 2019 Emmett Leahy Award (PDF), Emmett Leahy Award
- Tanna Chong (5 May 2014), "Greater push for archival law for more transparency", South China Morning Post, archived from the original on 2019-05-07
- Wu Wanying (25 March 2019), "The "Archives Law" legislates to close the archives management specialization project in the next academic year of Wanggang University. Zhu Fuqiang's teaching subjects are cut", Zhong News (in Chinese)
