= Cuningham =

Cuningham is a surname. Notable people with the surname include:

- David Cuningham (born 1997), Australian rules footballer
- Vera Cuningham (1897–1955), British artist
- William Cuningham, 16th-century English physician, astrologer, and engraver

== See also ==
- Cunningham
- Cuninghame
