= Charles Cunningham (disambiguation) =

Charles Cunningham (1755–1834) was an officer of the Royal Navy.

Charles Cunningham may also refer to:

- Charles Cunningham (civil servant) (1906–1998), Scottish civil servant
- Charles Cunningham (politician) American politician; state representative in Texas
- Charles E. Cunningham (1823–1895), American politician; Union Labor Party's nominee for Vice President of the United States, 1888
- Charles J. Cunningham (1932–2022), U.S. Air Force general
- Charles Milton Cunningham (1877–1936), politician, attorney and newspaper publisher in Louisiana
- Charles Orin Cunningham (1872–1942), provincial politician from Alberta, Canada
- Charlie Cunningham (mountain biker) (1948–2026), mountain biker from Fairfax, California
- Charlie Cunningham (footballer) (1890–1942), English footballer
- Charlie Cunningham (jockey) (1849–1906), Scottish Grand National winning jockey
- Charlie Cunningham (musician), singer-songwriter and guitarist from Bedfordshire, England
- Chuck Cunningham, a character who appeared in the first two seasons of the sitcom Happy Days

== See also ==
- Charles Cunningham Boycott, British land agent
