= Timothy J. Cunningham =

Epidemiologist and public health services leader

- Born: December 21, 1982; U.S.
- Died: 2018; Atlanta, Georgia, U.S.
- Occupation: Epidemiologist

Timothy Jerrell Cunningham (December 21, 1982 – 2018) was a Harvard-educated doctor with the US Center for Disease Control and Prevention. As an epidemiologist, he was a team leader in the US Public Health Service Commissioned Corps and was named in 2017 as part of the Atlanta Business Chronicle's 40 Under 40 list. He also was the co-author of 28 publications on topics about sleep deprivation, pulmonary disease and more. Cunningham graduated from Morehouse and earned his S.M. and Sc.D. from Harvard T.H. Chan School of Public Health.

On February 12, Cunningham left work early, complaining of not feeling well. His parents drove from Maryland to his house in Atlanta and found his phone, keys, wallet, car and his beloved dog, Mr. Bojangles. There was a $10,000 reward being offered by his family in partnership with Crime Stoppers Greater Atlanta.

Cunningham's remains were discovered Tuesday, April 3, 2018 in the Chattahoochee River in northwest Atlanta, police spokesman Carlos Campos said. According to Fulton County Chief Medical Examiner Dr. Jan Gorniak, the preliminary cause of death was drowning. A positive ID of the remains was made using dental records.

== Disappearance ==
On February 7, Cunningham resigned from a special USPHS deployment team tasked with deploying to areas in need by sending an email to Commander Richard Dunville.

“I thought he sounded exasperated,” Dunville told police. “In fact I would have encouraged him to stay on through June, when he would have received a service award, but he sounded too ready to leave.”

His supervisor Janet Croft told police that Cunningham left work quickly saying he felt ill on the morning of Friday February 9, shortly after he learned he had been passed over for a promotion.

On the morning of February 12, 2018, Cunningham's mother received a text message from him at around 5:21 a.m. "Are you awake?" he asked. She did not respond, as her phone was in silent mode. "I wish I had that opportunity to answer that text," she said later. He tried calling again, at 9:12 a.m. that day, but didn't leave a message when she didn't answer.

A day before Cunningham disappeared he told his neighbor's husband that his wife should erase his cellphone number from her phone.

== The search ==
While police interviewed those closest to Cunningham, local parks and cemeteries were searched on foot, and a helicopter scanned the area. There was no sign of Cunningham until the first week of April, over a month since he first went missing.

Sgt. Cortez Stafford, a spokesman for the Atlanta Fire Department, said the department had previously searched the area of the river where the body was found on February 23. At that time, Stafford said, there was no sign of a body. "It could have been there or it could have moved there later. There's just no way to tell due to the rise and fall of the river," he said.

"It was very difficult terrain, very difficult to access the location of where Mr. Cunningham was found," Stafford said. "It was in a remote area that's not easily accessible by walking trails, by vehicle or by people just being around there."

Cunningham's parents had been told that a body had been found four times since Cunningham initially went missing. They felt "heart-wrenching agony" each time, they said, only to learn it wasn't their son.

"It takes you to a place that the light is not shining in," Terrell Cunningham said. "I won't call it a dark place, but they are lows. This is extremely hard."

On April 3, 2018, two fishermen notified police after they spotted a body buried in mud and tangled in debris on the banks of the Chattahoochee River. There were no signs of trauma on the body, such as cuts or bruises, despite its state of advanced decomposition consistent with having been submerged, according to Fulton County Chief Medical Examiner Dr. Jan Gorniak.

According to Maj. Michael O'Connor of the Atlanta Police Department, Cunningham was wearing his "favorite jogging shoes" when he was found, and three crystals were in his pocket. He was known to be a crystal enthusiast and avid jogger.

"We may never be able to tell you how he got into the river," O'Connor said.

An autopsy confirmed that Cunningham drowned. The death was later ruled a suicide by drowning after toxicology reports were completed.

== Personal struggles ==
=== Medical issues ===
According to investigators, Cunningham's parents informed them that he was taking medication for a chronic disease, but did not provide details about the disease or when he was diagnosed.

==== Sexuality ====
Cunningham's best friend, Nell Reed, who lives in Texas, told police that Cunningham had struggled with his sexuality, and had had a “breakdown” back in 2010.

“She said that Tim talked to her about his feelings toward men and that he didn’t consider himself gay,” the case file states. However, Cunningham told Reed that he had recently gotten back in touch with an old classmate from Morehouse College. “She said the person had been coming to Tim’s house and that Tim began to question whether the person was playing with his feelings,” police said. The classmate told investigators that he had subsequently blocked Cunningham's number.

“He said he didn’t want to be confrontational because they moved in the same social circles but it was obvious to him that Mr. Cunningham was making light advances,” police wrote in the investigative file.

On Feb. 9, Cunningham saw his former classmate on a date with a woman, and the two shook hands. Cunningham invited the man to go out for breakfast the next morning, but he declined.

Cunningham's sister stated, however, that she believed Cunningham was interested in two female coworkers.

== Impact on family ==
“I feel like I’m in a horrible ‘Black Mirror’ episode,” his sister, Tiara Cunningham, told the New York Times, referencing the dystopian sci-fi television show. “I’m kind of lost without him, to be quite honest.”

She told the Washington Post that she speaks with her brother often, but their conversation Feb. 12 left her concerned. “He sounded not like himself,” she said. He did not reply to a text message she sent later, and their mother, Tia-Juana Cunningham, was not able reach him either.

Terrell Cunningham also had concerns about recent interactions with his son, whom he described as focused on a host of professional and personal issues.

“The tone and the numerous exchanges gave us reason to be concerned about Tim,” he said. “And I don’t know if it’s an instinct you have because it’s your child, but it was not a normal conversation, and I was not comfortable.”

== Remembrances ==
On April 21, Morehouse College hosted a memorial service for Cunningham, which was attended by approximately 600 people. Cunningham had earned his undergraduate degree at Morehouse in 2004.

The memorial was a celebration of Tim's life, his passion for public service, and his drive to succeed. “It wasn’t just a career or job for him,” Capt. Marcella Law with the National Center for Chronic Disease Prevention and Health Promotion told the crowd. “Tim felt that it was his calling to use his gift and change lives.”

== See also ==
- List of solved missing person cases (post-2000)
