= James D. Cunningham =

American manufacturer

James Dalton Cunningham (May 5, 1887 – July 25, 1963) was an American manufacturer, president of the Republic Flow Meters Co. in Chicago, and inventor, who served as the 69th president of the American Society of Mechanical Engineers.

== Biography ==
=== Youth, education and early career ===
Cunningham was born in Chicago in 1887, son of William H. Cunningham and Josephine (Dalton) Cunningham. His father was manager with the Fire Association of Philadelphia, now Reliance Insurance Company. He lost his mother at the age of 5 and his father at 13. When he graduated from Hyde Park High School at 18, his grandfather James P. Dalton offered to pay his studies at the Armour Institute. However, he declined with thanks.

In 1905, Cunningham started as a clerk with the Amour Glue works, Chicago, where he soon moved into sales. Later its chief engineer Charles Brown offered to sell him his own small manufacturing enterprise. Cunningham bought the Clyde Machine Works Company with a partner, and served as its vice-president from 1909 to 1911.

=== Further career and recognition ===
In 1911, Cunningham was founder and president of the Steam Appliance Company, manufacturer of industrial instruments and controls in Chicago. The company was later renamed Republic Flow Meters Company, and in the 1930s Cunningham became chairman of the board.

From 1932 to 1940, Cunningham was chairman of the Board of Trustees of the Armour Institute of Technology. He assisted in the merger with the Lewis Institute in 1940 into the Illinois Institute of Technology, and served as chairman of its board until 1961. In the year 1950-51, he also served as president of the American Society of Mechanical Engineers.

Cunningham was awarded the honorary doctorate of engineering by the Illinois Institute of Technology in 1946, and the Rensselaer Polytechnic Institute in 1950. In 1957, he was awarded the Missouri Honor Award for Distinguished Service in Engineering.

== Publications ==
- James D. Cunningham. "Education and Industry vs. Manpower," in: Power Engineering, Volume 46-48. Technical Publishing Company, 1942. p. 51

Patents, a selection

- "Patent US2073143 - Chart," March 9, 1937.
- "Patent US2119950 - Recording instrument," June 7, 1938.
- "Patent US2152303 - Recording instrument," March 28, 1938.
