= Brysson Cunningham =

Dr Brysson Cunningham FRSE DSc MICE (1868–1950) was a Scottish civil engineer and author specialising in harbour and dock design and operation. In the early 20th century he was generally viewed as the authority in this field.

== Life ==
Brysson Cunningham was born in December 1868.

In 1890 he was appointed as a draughtsman at the Dock Yard, Liverpool Docks. In 1908 he moved to work with the Port of London Authority.

Brysson Cunningham also lectured on Waterways, Harbours and Docks at University College London in the early 20th century.

He was elected a Fellow of the Royal Society of Edinburgh in 1917, his proposers being William Dyce Cay, Ernest Romney Matthews, Benjamin Hall Blyth, and Sir Frank Watson Dyson.

He died in September 1950.

== Publications ==
- Mineral Shipments at British Ports (1904)
- First Stage Building Construction (1904)
- A Treatise on the Principles and Practice of Dock Engineering (1904)
- The Dock and Harbour Engineer’s Reference Book (1914)
- Port Administration and Operation (1925)
- Cargo Handling at Ports (1926)
- Port Economics (1926)
- Port Studies (1928)
- Estuary Channels and Embankments (1938)
