= Jack Cunningham (disambiguation) =

Jack Cunningham, Baron Cunningham of Felling (born 1939) is a British Labour Party politician.

Jack Cunningham may also refer to:

- Jack Cunningham (screenwriter) (1882–1941), American screenwriter
- Jack Armand Cunningham (1890–1956), English World War I flying ace
- Jack Cunningham (rower) (1912–1975), Canadian Olympic rower
- Jack Cunningham (bishop) (1926–1978), Anglican bishop of Central Zambia
- Jack Cunningham (footballer) (born 1940), Australian rules footballer

== See also ==
- John Cunningham (disambiguation)
