= Elmer T. Cunningham =

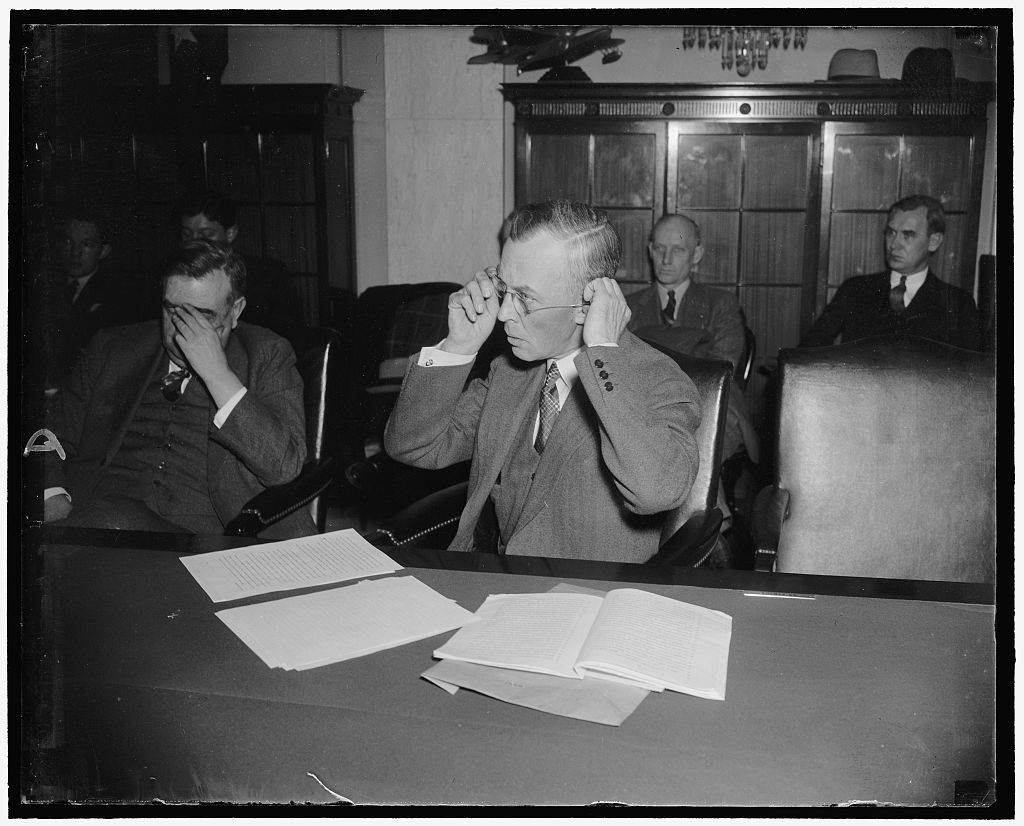
- Cunningham photo from RCA Broasdcast News, April 1933
- Born: September 1, 1889; San Francisco
- Died: June 14, 1965 (aged 75); Monterey, California
- Occupation: Vacuum tube manufacturer
- Known for: Audio Tron vacuum tube

Elmer Tiling Cunningham (September 1, 1889 – June 14, 1965) was an American entrepreneur and businessman, specializing in vacuum tubes and radio manufacturing. He is best known for being the most successful business person to produce counterfeit (AKA bootleg) or unlicensed vacuum tubes (1915-1920). Cunningham was in direct violation by infringing on the Fleming and De Forest vacuum tube patents. Unlike other businesses making unlicensed or bootlegged vacuum tubes, Cunningham was very aggressive in his advertising. Manufacturers of counterfeit vacuum tubes generally ended their activities after a lawsuit has been filed but Cunningham came out ahead after various lawsuits brought against him and his company, the Audio Tron Sales Company. His successes encouraged many others to do the same thing.

== Early life ==
Elmer Tiling Cunningham was born, September 1, 1889 in San Francisco. Cunningham's parents were John Francis Cunningham and Fanna E. Tiling. He graduated from Lowell High School, San Francisco in December 1906. At a young age he was interested in wireless and related topics. In 1910 he collaborated with George Francis Haller to write, "The Tesla High Frequency Coil: Its Construction and Uses".

== Audio Tron vacuum tube and business activities before WW1 ==
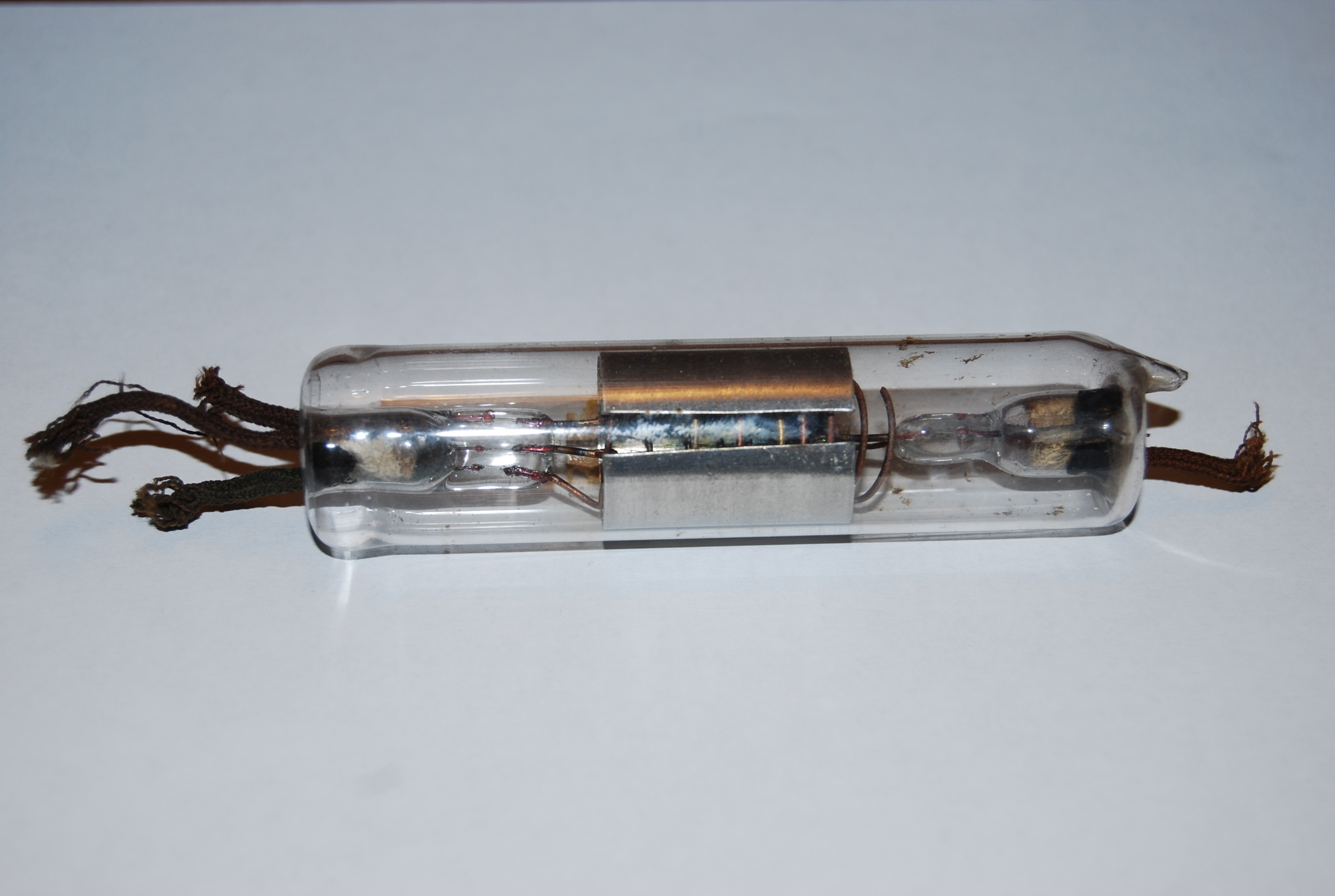
The Audio Tron Triode Tube (1915–1917). Paper label missing.

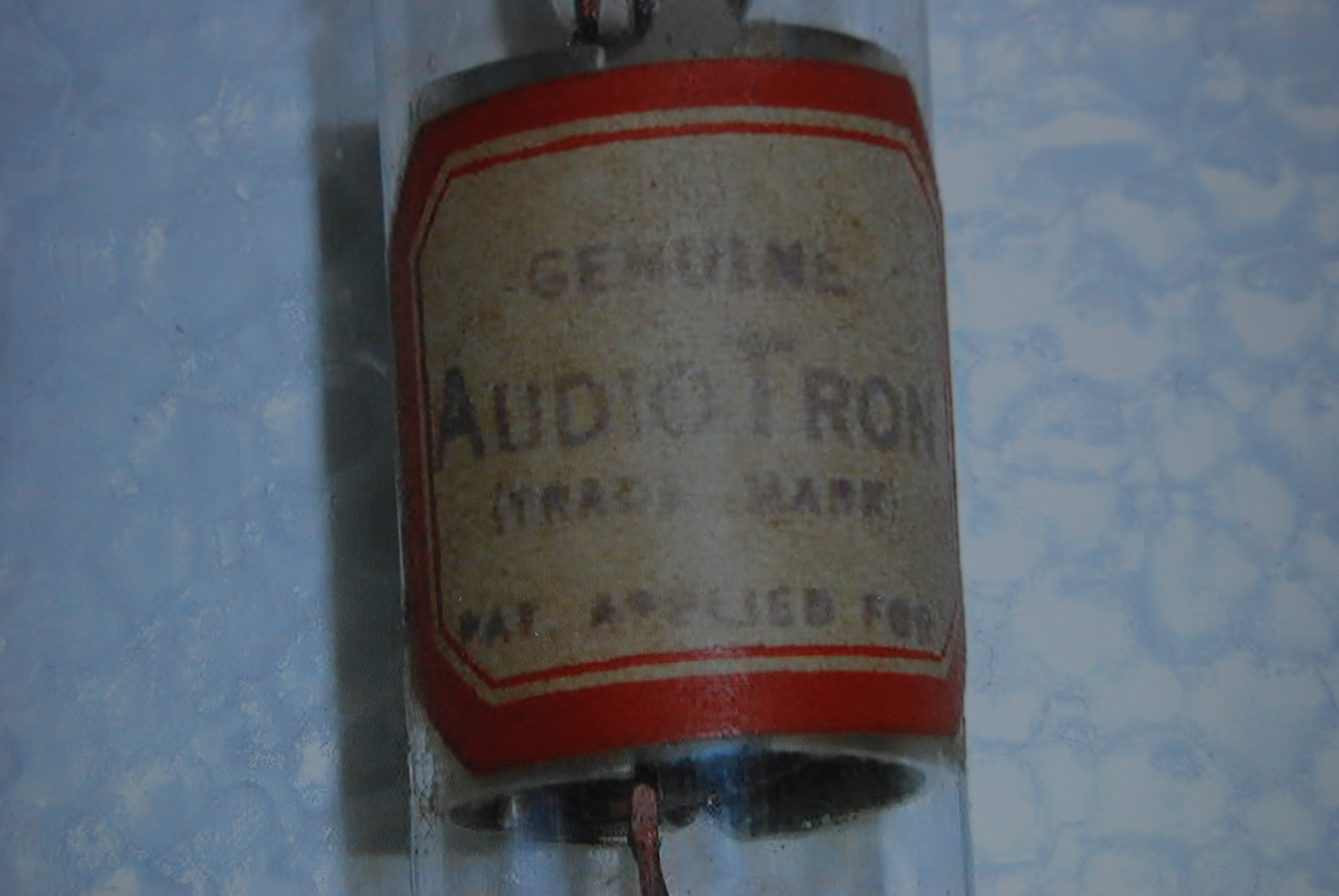
Paper identification label used on the Audio Tron vacuum tube

In 1915 Cunningham started the Audio Tron Sales Company in San Francisco. Based on the West Coast, he was in direct competition with Lee de Forest, a leading manufacturer of triodes sold under the Audion brand.

Before 1915, triode vacuum tubes were spherical or shaped like an incandescent light bulb. Cunningham took a different route. His triode tube was tubular and had the capability of being double sided. This design allowed dual filaments, which provided longer operating life. Cunningham was able to produce this vacuum tube in large numbers and maintain quality. The rise in amateur radio interest was a great asset to Audio Tron sales. This design proved influential on vacuum tube production, and prompted De Forest to come up with a Tubular Audion.

Another important design in the Audio Tron Tube is the use of a cylindrical plate instead of the typical flat plate in the audion. The cylindrical plate provided better gain and tube efficiency. This design for the Audio Tron was probably inspired by George Haller with whom he co-authored the book about Tesla Coils.

In February 1916 DeForest Company sued Audio Tron for infringement of the DeForest Audion patent. The lawsuit was settled out of court and Cunningham continued to sell Audio Trons uninterrupted. The competition between Cunningham and DeForest then became a price war on the West Coast. Every time DeForest Company lowered the price of their vacuum tubes, the Audio Tron Company responded by lowering their prices as well. The original price of the Audio Tron when it first came out was $7.50. Less than a year later it was $5.25.

Elmer Cunningham would continue to make Audio Trons until April 6, 1917. With the coming of World War I, the US Government ordered all amateur radio equipment either dismantled or put away. This resulted in a large loss of market for Audio Tron, and their sales stopped.

=== Original Audio Tron flyer ===
This LINK will show you what a 1915 Advertisement by Audio Tron Sales looked like. The flyer explains the advantages over competitor vacuum tubes and gives testimonials from users.

=== Other Cunningham business ventures ===
In 1916, Elmer T. Cunningham and his writing partner George Haller formed the Haller-Cunningham Company. The main purpose was to sell and make wireless equipment. In addition, Cunningham provided financial backing to Otis B. Moorehead late in 1915, to start a new vacuum tube company, called Moorehead Laboratories also based in San Francisco, CA. In July 1916 Otis Moorehead marketed the Electron Relay Tube. This vacuum tube was similar in appearance as Cunningham's Audio Tron. Like the Audio Tron Moorehead's tube would cut into De Forest's tube business on the west coast and De Forest would take legal action on Moorehead as well. Moorehead would later make the first military tubes for the US and United Kingdom during World War I.

== Cunningham's vacuum tube business after WW1 ==
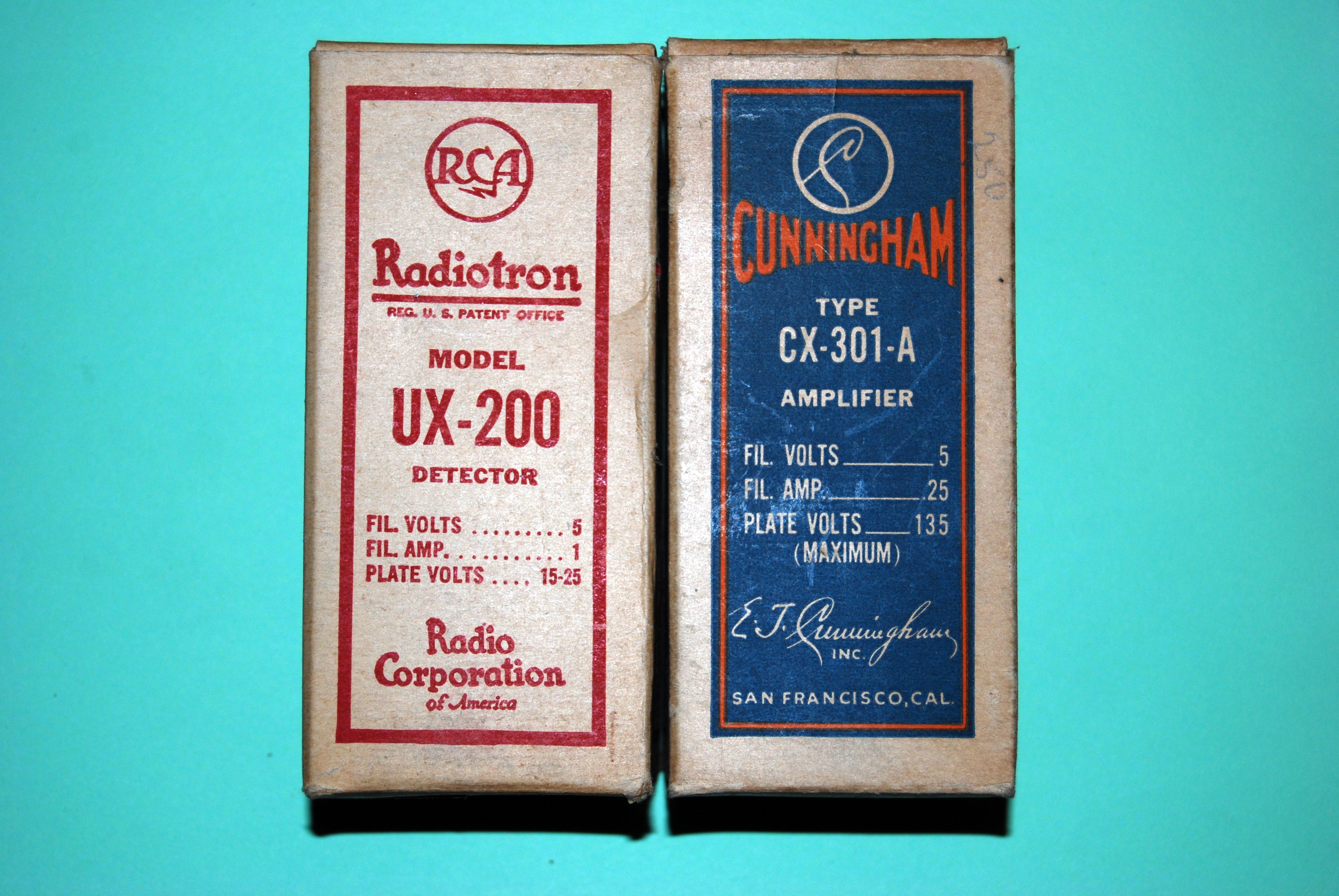
E.T. Cunningham versus RCA Tube cartons after the 1920 RCA Lawsuit against Audio Tron Sales. Notice that the box dimensions and art work layout are similar.

The Audio Tron tubes went on sale again after June 1919. Cunningham launched an aggressive sales plan that made claims that his tubes were licensed under the Fleming or DeForest patents. His competitors on the west coast put out counter advertising that his tubes were not licensed. His competitors were legally right, Cunningham's Audio Tron was never a licensed product (that is, it was a bootleg).

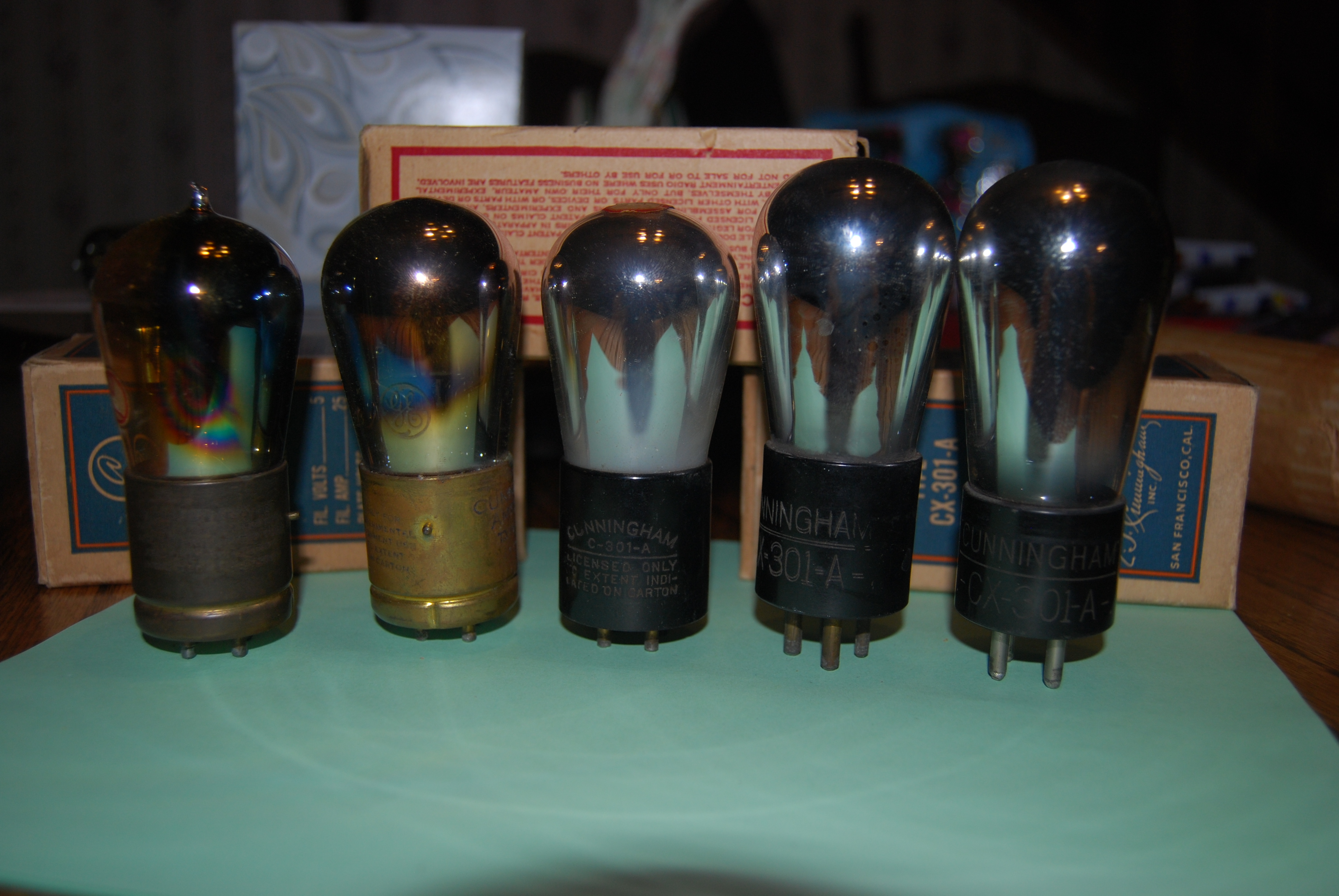
Set of Cunningham Tubes from 1921-1924. Notice that Audio Tron name is gone and replaced by Cunningham. If you look carefully at the second tube from the left, a faint GE trademark can be seen. This tells us that Cunningham was not making tubes anymore.

Later in 1919, the Radio Corporation of America (RCA) took legal action against Cunningham for the violation of the Flemming and DeForest patents. The decision made by the US District Court for Northern California proved quite favorable to Cunningham. The court decision summary was as follows:

- Cunningham gets permission to have his tubes licensed for 90 days and limited to 5000 units
- Audio Tron Sales will be renamed as Audio Tron Manufacturing Company
- After the 90 days RCA would supply Cunningham with tubes and packaging of his choice until DeForest patent expired. All of these items will have Cunningham's name, labels and trademarks
- After the 90 days Cunningham would get a guaranteed a set minimum of tubes each year until the DeForest patent expired.

By 1921, Audio Tron Manufacturing Company started slowly changing their name to "E.T. Cunningham Inc." This continued until 1931 when a new line was added:

E.T. Cunningham Inc., A Subsidiary of Radio Corporation of America

An advertising page for Audio Tron tubes in Pacific Radio News August 1920 shows Cunningham's early response to the court decision.

How Elmer Cunningham was able to get such a favorable decision with RCA remains unknown. According to Alan Douglas, a noted radio historian, there might have been some "dirt" or material Elmer had on certain RCA individuals that helped his case. Douglas mentions Bob Palmer, an old-time wireless man on the west coast who knew everyone including Cunningham. He did not have a high opinion of Cunningham and considered him "lower than a snake in the grass". In summary Douglas says, "No proof, but Cunningham had to have had some sort of bargaining chip".

=== Cunningham company bought: Now part of RCA ===
In later years after the court decision, Cunningham played a bigger part in RCA's business activities. According to the RCA Publication " RCA, an Historical Perspective" by 1931 the E.T. Cunningham Company became an integral part of RCA and consolidated with the RCA Radiotron Company, giving RCA rights to the use of the Cunningham brand. In addition, Elmer T. Cunningham became a part of the RCA organization. In 1932 his name appears on page 16 of the August–September edition of "Music Trade Review" as President of RCA Radiotron Division (vacuum tube production and distribution). By the mid-1930s he rose to the position of president of RCA Manufacturing Division. Cunningham's name is cited as president in RCA's Broadcast News through #23 December 1936 but not in #24 May 1937. In 1936 he was involved with negotiations over a major labor dispute at the Camden, New Jersey plant with several labor unions.

== Remler ==
By the mid-1920s Cunningham's agreements with RCA proved to be quite profitable for him. With new tubes being developed at a rapid pace, the manufacture and demand of radio sets also grew at a fast pace. In 1918 he started Remler ("Elmer" spelled backwards, with an extra r for "radios"). Remler was originally involved with making and selling parts for wireless projects. Later, they moved into radio sales in the form of "do it yourself" kit radios and some already assembled models. In 1922 Cunningham sold his share to Thomas Gray and Ernest Danielson. The company was based in San Francisco, CA. The Remler name remained in business and in San Francisco Bay Area until 1988.

== Family notes ==
Elmer Cunningham was married to Alice M (maiden name unknown). They had one child. Based on records, his wife enjoyed owning antique furniture of great value. According to Sotheby's and the Metropolitan Museum of Art several pieces of furniture were sold off in 1959 by Mrs. Elmer T. Cunningham of Monterey.
