= Paul Cunningham (chef) =

English chef

Paul Cunningham (born 1969) is an English chef working in Denmark. He was awarded a Michelin star at The Paul (da) and as of 2017, has two stars at Henne Kirkeby Kro.

== Early life and training ==
Cunningham was born and grew up in rural Essex. He first worked as a cook in a country pub in Widdington and then in various restaurants and country house hotels, including Danesfield House and Lords of the Manor, before moving to Denmark in 1994.

== Career ==
In Denmark Cunningham started as fish cook and became head chef at Søllerød Kro, which during his time there acquired one of the first Michelin stars awarded in the country, then at Formel B, where he trained Mads Refslund, and at Coquus and Plaza before becoming co-owner and chef at The Paul, located in Glassalen, the glass pavilion at Tivoli in Copenhagen. The park had had a reputation for poor food; at The Paul, Cunningham became a celebrity chef, cooking for Margrethe II of Denmark, Helena Christensen, and for Bill Clinton, Paris Hilton and Metallica when they visited Denmark. The restaurant was awarded a Michelin star in 2003, nine months after opening.

After the restaurant suffered during the 2008 financial crisis and after being hospitalised in spring 2011 with a stress-related condition and refused reduced hours by Tivoli management, Cunningham closed The Paul late that year. He then in 2012 succeeded Allan Poulsen as chef at Henne Kirkeby Kro, an eighteenth-century inn (kro) in Henne Kirkeby, a village in Varde Municipality. Henne Kirkeby Kro was awarded its first Michelin star in 2016 and a second in 2017.

Cunningham was invited to open Noma but declined, suggesting René Redzepi.

At previous restaurants, Cunningham's cooking used precision techniques such as molecular cuisine; at Henne Kirkeby Kro he announced that he would make use of the restaurant's kitchen garden—the largest in Denmark—and access to the coast and fresh fish to perform "intuitive", jazz-inspired cooking. He has said that his cooking is not Nordic cuisine as such: that he is "an incorrigible Francophile" and "[has] travelled too much to say no to Pakistani mangoes or galangal". He decides everything about the menu, which he has called "a gastronome's Russian roulette"; it "may consist of anything from pig ears with oyster aioli to duck decorated with marigolds" and emphasises the fresh ingredients.

Cunningham is a member of a chef's collective called Gelinaz! He has also won the Danish hot-dog championship three times.

== Publications ==
As of February 2017, Cunningham has published eight cookery books.

== Private life ==
Cunningham lives in Korsør with his wife, Lene, and children, currently spending half the week there because of the distance from Henne Kirkeby, and is active as a photographer. He says that he cannot work without music.
