= Joseph Cunningham =

Joseph Cunningham or Joe Cunningham may refer to:

== Sportspeople ==
- Joe Cunningham (baseball) (1931–2021), American baseball first baseman and outfielder
- Joe Cunningham (Gaelic footballer) (1931–2012), Northern Irish Gaelic footballer
- Joe Cunningham (tennis) (1867–1951), American tennis player
- Joe Cunningham (baseball, born 1963), baseball player who played in the 1992 St. Louis Cardinals season
- Joe Cunningham (hurler), teammate of Kieran Carey
- Joey Cunningham, York City F.C. player

== Others ==
- Joseph Lewis Cunningham (1784–1843), auctioneer in Boston, Massachusetts
- Joseph Davey Cunningham (1812–1851), Scottish historian
- Joseph Thomas Cunningham (1859–1935), British zoologist
- Joseph Cunningham (Northern Ireland politician) (1877–1965), Unionist politician in Northern Ireland
- Joseph F. Cunningham, American jurist
- Joe Cunningham (American politician) (born 1982), former member of the United States House of Representatives from South Carolina
- Joe Cunningham (trade unionist), Irish trade union leader
- Joe Cunningham, actor who appeared in It's in the Air
- Joseph Cunningham, member of the Legislative Council of the Isle of Man
