= John Cunningham =

John or Johnny Cunningham may refer to:

== Military ==
- John Cunningham (17th-century officer) (fl. 1689), Anglo-Irish soldier at the Siege of Derry
- John Cunningham, 15th Earl of Glencairn (1749–1796), Scottish nobleman, cavalry officer, and priest
- John Cunningham (Royal Navy officer) (1885–1962), RN, First Sea Lord
- John Cunningham (VC 1917) (1890–1917), Prince of Wales's Leinster Regiment
- John Cunningham (VC 1916) (1897–1941), East Yorkshire Regiment
- John Cunningham (RAF officer) (1917–2002), RAF night fighter ace, nicknamed 'Cat's Eyes'

== Politics and law ==
- Sir John Cunningham, 1st Baronet (died 1684), member of the Parliament of Scotland
- John Cunningham (Nova Scotia judge) (fl. 1761–1785), Canadian judge and politician
- John Cunningham (Nova Scotia politician) (1776–1847), Canadian farmer, official and politician
- John Cunninghame, Lord Cunninghame (1782–1854), Scottish judge
- John Cunningham (Australian politician) (1867–1949), Australian politician in Western Australia
- J. M. A. Cunningham (1912–1996), Australian politician in Western Australia
- John E. Cunningham (1931–2025), U.S. Representative from Washington
- John F. Cunningham (died 1954), Irish surgeon and member of the 7th Seanad of Ireland
- John M. Cunningham, American attorney and member of the Massachusetts Governor's Council

== Religion ==
- John William Cunningham (1780–1861), evangelical clergyman of the Church of England
- John Cunningham (moderator) (1819–1893), General Assembly of the Church of Scotland in 1886
- John Francis Cunningham (bishop) (1842–1919), Irish-born prelate of the Roman Catholic Church
- John Cunningham (bishop) (1938–2021), Roman Catholic bishop of Galloway, Scotland

== Science and medicine ==
- John Francis Cunningham (surgeon) (1875–1932), British ophthalmic surgeon
- John R. Cunningham (1927–2020), Canadian medical physicist
- John Cunningham (physician) (born 1949), physician to the Queen of the United Kingdom

== Sports ==
- John Cunningham (cricketer) (1854–1932), New Zealand cricketer
- John Cunningham (Scottish footballer) (1868–?), Scottish footballer
- John Cunningham (baseball) (1892–1922), Negro leagues shortstop
- John Crabbe Cunningham (1927–1980), Scottish mountaineer
- John Cunningham (rugby league) (born 1952), English rugby league footballer of the 1970s, for England, and Barrow
- John Cunningham (Australian footballer) (born 1974), Geelong, Norwood and Port Melbourne player
- John Cunningham (Gaelic footballer) (fl. 1980s–1990s), played for Donegal
- John Cunningham (Northern Ireland footballer), football coach and former football player

== Writers ==
- John Cunningham (poet and dramatist) (1729–1773), Irish pastoral poet and dramatist
- John W. Cunningham (1915–2002), American author of Western novels and stories
- John T. Cunningham (1915–2012), American journalist, writer, and historian
- John Cunningham (journalist) (1945–2012), Irish newspaper editor

== Others ==
- John Cunningham (sorcerer) (aka "Doctor Fian", died 1591), Scottish schoolmaster executed for sorcery in the North Berwick witch trials
- John Cunningham (explorer) (c. 1575–1651), Scottish explorer for Denmark
- John Cunningham (architect) (1799–1873), Scottish architect
- John Cunningham (voyageur) (1817–1870), Canadian voyageur
- Juan Cunningham (1817–1871), British businessman
- John Patrick Cunningham (1947–1974), Irish mentally handicapped man who was killed by the British Army
- John Rood Cunningham (1891–1980), American academic, president of Davidson College
- Johnny Cunningham (1957–2003), Scottish folk musician
- John Cunningham (Irish criminal), Irish kidnapper and illicit drug smuggler
- John James Cunningham (1904–2004), American painter, teacher, and founder of the Carmel Art Institute in Carmel-by-the-Sea, California
- John Cunningham (actor) (1932–2026), American actor

== Other uses ==
- Human polyomavirus 2, referred as "John Cunningham virus"

== See also ==
- Jack Cunningham (disambiguation)
