= James Cunningham (botanist) =

Scottish botanist and surgeon

- Occupations: Botanist and surgeon

James Cunningham (died 1709?) was a Scottish botanist and surgeon.

== Biography ==
In 1698, Cunningham traveled as a surgeon to the factory established by the East India Company at Xiamen (then romanized as Emouï), on the coast of China, and in 1700 made a second voyage to the settlement at Zhoushan (then romanized as Chusan), on which island he remained two years.

During his stay, he turned his scientific knowledge to the good account and made large botanical and other collections. Through Cunningham's diligence, Hans Sloane was enabled to add considerably to his cabinets and garden. He was the first Englishman to make botanical collections in China, and sent over to John Ray, Leonard Plukenet, and James Petiver many new plants, for which he is repeatedly thanked in their works; indeed his name occurs on almost every page of Plukenet's ‘Amaltheum Botanicum,’ where his collections, to the number of four hundred plants, are described, and in the third volume of the same writer's ‘Phytographia,’ where drawings are given of them. Petiver described about two hundred of Cunningham's plants in his ‘Museum.’ The whole collection forms the part of the Sloane Herbaria, now in the Natural History Museum. From Ascension Island, Cunningham forwarded to Petiver an account of the plants and shells he observed there. In February 1702–3, he was sent to the company's station at Côn Sơn Island (then referred to by the British as Pulo Condore) to try and open up a trade with Cochinchina, but, through the jealousy of the Chinese, the attempt proved a failure, and in 1705 the Macassars, growing distrustful, made a sudden attack on the English, whom they killed almost to a man. Cunningham escaped the massacre only to endure a captivity of nearly two years in Cochinchina, from which he proceeded in 1707 to Batavia, and thence to Banjarmasin, to take charge of that settlement. He did not meet with any better success there, for a few weeks after his arrival the Banjarese, at the instigation of the Chinese, expelled him by dint of superior numbers, and destroyed the settlement (Bruce, Annals of the East India Company, iii. 664). Soon after this Cunningham embarked for England. His last letter, addressed jointly to Sloane and Petiver, is dated ‘Calcutta, 4 Jan. 1708–9,’ and he expresses a hope of overtaking it, and therefore writes but briefly. It was received by Sloane ‘about August 1709.’ What became of him is not known, for no trace of his will or report of his death is to be found in this country. He probably never reached England, but died on the voyage home.

The East India Company acknowledged his services by appointing him in 1704 second in the council of the factory at Borneo, and in 1707 chief of Banjar.

Cunningham had been elected as a fellow of the Royal Society in 1699, and his contributions to the ‘Philosophical Transactions’ are both numerous and important. The following may be mentioned: ‘An Account of a Voyage to Chusan in China’ (xxiii. 1201–1209; reprinted in vol. i. of Harris's ‘Voyages’), in which he was the first writer to give an accurate description of the tea plant; ‘Observations on the Weather, made in a Voyage to China,’ 1700 (xxiv. 1639); ‘A Register of the Wind and Weather at China, with the observations of the mercurial barometer at Chusan, from November 1700 to January 1702’ (xxiv. 1648). His account of the massacre at Côn Sơn (a copy of which is to be found in the Sloane MS. No. 3322, ff. 76–7) was afterwards inserted in the modern part of the ‘Universal History, (x. 154, edit. 1759). Many of his letters to Petiver are preserved in the Sloane MS. No. 3322, ff. 54–75; those to Sloane himself are in the same collection, No. 4041, ff. 317–36. He invariably spells his name ‘Cuninghame.’ Robert Brown named a species of Rubia after Cunningham.
