= Martha Jane Cunningham =

Canadian missionary

- Born: 3 June 1856; Halifax, Nova Scotia
- Died: 22 April 1916 (age 59); Sault Ste. Marie, Ontario
- Occupations: Missionary, educator, school principal

Martha Jane Cunningham (3 June 1856 – 22 April 1916) was a Canadian missionary educator in Japan. She was first principal of Shizuoka Eiwa Girls' School in Shizuoka, which was founded in 1887.

== Early life and education ==
Cunningham was born in Halifax, Nova Scotia, the daughter of William Cunningham and Matilda Ellen Burns Cunningham. Her father was a clothier. Both of her parents were born in Ireland.

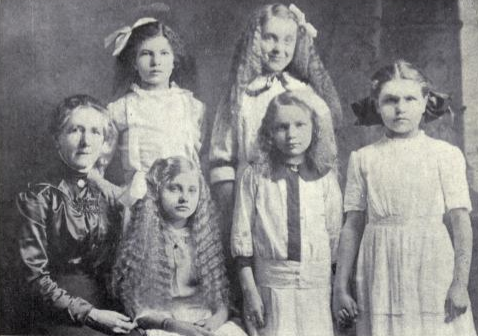
Martha Jane Cunningham with five students in Sault Ste. Marie in the 1910s, from a 1917 publication

== Career ==
Cunningham was a teacher with the Women's Missionary Society of the Methodist Church of Canada. She went to Japan in 1887. She worked with a Japanese Methodist minister and a local official, and became the first principal of the first girls' school in Shizuoka that year. She traveled in Japan, often with other Western women teachers. While in Canada on furloughs, she taught and spoke to Canadian audiences about Japan and her work, with illustrations. She left Japan after her third term of service, during the 1906–1907 academic year.

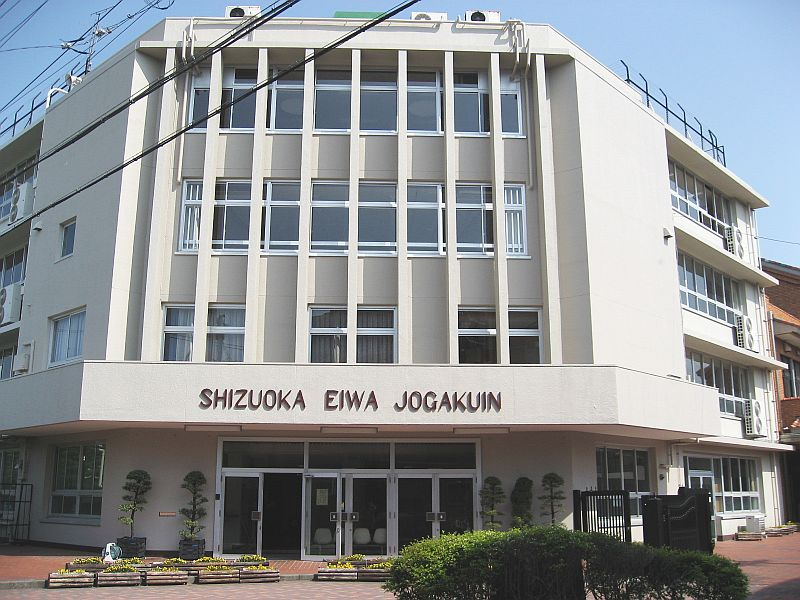
Shizuoka Eiwa Jogakuin (Girls School), the modern continuation of the girls' school founded by Cunningham and others, as it appeared in 2009

Beginning in 1913, Cunningham was a mission teacher in Sault Ste. Marie, Ontario, working mainly with European immigrant women and children. She was a member of the Daughters of the Empire and of the Red Cross Society.

== Personal life and legacy ==
Cunningham died in 1916, at the age of 59, in Sault Ste. Marie. In Shizuoka, the alumnae of Shizuoka Eiwa Jogakko, the Methodist Church, and local officials held a memorial service in June 1916, and the school placed a portrait of Cunningham in the students' library, along with books donated in tribute. At the centennial of the school in 1987, a memorial marker was placed for Cunningham on the school's grounds. The school is still operating as of 2023, as is the women's college it launched in 1966, now a university.
