= Archibald Cunningham =

Scottish footballer

Personal information
- Full name: Archibald Cunningham
- Date of birth: 30 April 1879
- Place of birth: Rosewell, Scotland
- Date of death: 18 March 1915 (aged 35)
- Place of death: Pas-de-Calais, France
- Position: Goalkeeper

Senior career*
| Years | Team | Apps | (Gls) |
| 1900–1903 | Leith Athletic | 30 | (0) |
- Broxburn Shamrock
- Glentoran
- * Club domestic league appearances and goals

Archibald Cunningham (30 April 1879 – 18 March 1915) was a Scottish professional footballer who played as a goalkeeper in the Scottish League for Leith Athletic.

== Personal life ==
Cunningham was born in Rosewell and grew up in Lasswade. He enlisted in the Highland Light Infantry in March 1903 and later worked as a miner at the Woolmet Pits. In September 1914, shortly after the outbreak of the First World War, Cunningham re-enlisted as a private in the Highland Light Infantry. Cunningham was killed in France on 18 March 1915 after the Battle of Neuve Chapelle and is commemorated on the Le Touret Memorial.
