= Robert Cunningham =

Robert Cunningham may refer to:

== Politics, nobility, and law ==
- Robert Cunningham (politician) (1836–1874), Canadian journalist and Member of Parliament
- Robert Roy Cunningham (1876–1958), member of the California legislature
- Robert O'Darrell Cunningham (1918–1986), American politician and member of the Oklahoma House of Representatives
- Sir Robert Cunningham, several of the Cunningham baronets

== Religion ==
- Robert Cunningham (minister) (died 1637), Scottish minister who settled in Ulster
- Robert Cunningham (entrepreneur) (1837–1905), Canadian lay missionary, entrepreneur and founder of Port Essington, British Columbia
- Robert J. Cunningham (born 1943), Roman Catholic bishop

== Science ==
- Robert Oliver Cunningham (1841–1918), Scottish naturalist
- Robert M. Cunningham (1919–2008), American meteorologist
- Steve Cunningham (computer scientist) (Robert Stephen Cunningham, 1942–2015), American computer scientist
- Robert K. Cunningham (born 1963), American engineer

== See also ==
- Robert Bontine Cunninghame Graham (1852–1936), Scottish politician, writer, journalist and adventurer
- Bob Cunningham (disambiguation)
