= Edward Francis Cunningham =

Scottish portrait painter

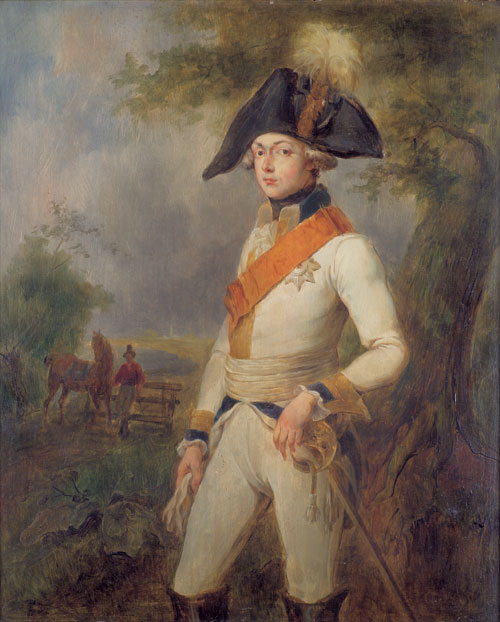
Prince Louis Charles of Prussia, ca. 1786.

Edward Francis Cunningham (c. 1742–1795), also known as Francesco Calza or Calze, was a Scottish portrait painter.

He came from a good Scotch family, and is said to have been born at Kelso about 1742. His father, having been implicated in the attempt of the Pretender in 1745, was obliged to flee from Scotland to the Continent, and took his son with him. Cunningham studied art with much perseverance at Parma, Rome, Venice, and Paris. He is said to have assumed the cognomen of 'Calze' in Italy. Soon after his arrival in Paris, he inherited the family estates, and shortly afterwards a second bequest fell to his share, but being dissipated and extravagant, he speedily ran through all his money, and was then induced to follow the Duchess of Kingston to Russia. On leaving her Grace, he entered the service of the Russian court, and afterwards went to Berlin, where he found full employment as a portrait painter. Unhappily, his improvident habits continued, and he finally moved to London, where he died in great poverty in 1795.

As a portrait painter, he achieved a deserved success, and some of his portraits have been engraved. He also painted a few historical subjects.
