= Glenn Cunningham =

Glenn Cunningham may refer to:

- Glenn Cunningham (runner) (1909–1988), American runner, Olympic Games medalist
- Glenn Cunningham (Nebraska politician) (1912–2003), American politician, mayor of Omaha, and congressman for Nebraska
- Glenn Cunningham (New Jersey politician) (1943–2004), American politician, mayor of Jersey City
- Glenn Cunningham (speedway rider) (born 1975), British speedway rider, finalist of 1994 Individual U-21 World Championship

== See also ==
- Glenn Cunningham Lake, named after Glenn Cunningham, Nebraska politician
