= Adrian Cunningham =

Australian archivist

- Born: 1960 (age 65–66); Brisbane, Australia
- Occupation: Archivist
- Known for: Records management

Adrian Cunningham (born 1960) is an Australian archivist who worked for many years at the National Archives of Australia. He is known for his contributions to the practice of digital records management, including development of international standards in this field.

== Career ==
Adrian Cunningham was born in Brisbane, Australia, in 1960. In 1981 he became a qualified librarian in Sydney, Australia. He started his career as a specialist in manuscripts at the Mitchell Library of New South Wales. He transferred to the National Library of Australia in Canberra, at first as a manuscript specialist, then managing the oral history section, working in the National Preservation Office, leading the international relations unit and taking part in national collaborative projects.

Cunningham worked as an archivist at the Pacific Manuscripts Bureau and as a librarian at the State Library of New South Wales. He managed Electronic Services Delivery for the Office of Government Information Technology. In 1988 he transferred to the National Archives of Australia (NAA) as director of recordkeeping standards and policies. After seven years in this role he was made responsible for strategic relations and personal records at the NAA. As Director, Strategic Relations and Personal Records he was responsible for collaborations between the NAA and domestic and international partners in government, industry, the professions and academia. His primary concern was digital recordkeeping and other computer-related initiatives.

In 2011 Cunningham became director of the Digital Archives Program at the Queensland State Archives. Later, he also assumed responsibility for government recordkeeping. In 2016 Cunningham was Queensland's state archivist for six months. Cunningham retired from the Queensland State Archives in January 2017.

== Other activities ==
Cunningham has held positions in various archives-related organizations:

- President, Convenor and Fellow of the Australian Society of Archivists
- Secretary of the International Council on Archives (ICA) Committee on Descriptive Standards
- Treasurer of the Pacific Regional Branch of the ICA
- Member of Standards Australia’s Committee IT/21, Records Management
- Member of UNESCO's Australian Memory of the World Committee.

Cunningham was president of the Australian Society of Archivists from 1998 to 2000. He was founding convenor of the society's Collecting Archives Special Interest Group, and chair of the society's Descriptive Standards Committee. He has held senior advisory positions for Comma: International Journal on Archives and Journal on Archival Organization. On the ICA's Committee on Descriptive Standards he participated in developing the second editions on the ISAD(G) and ISAAR(CPF) standards, and of the draft Records in Contexts standard. He was secretary of the ICA Committee on Descriptive Standards from 2002 to 2004.

== Recognition ==
Cunningham has been acknowledged as a key figure in adopting and adapting modern approaches to macroappraisal in Australia. (Note: The macroappraisal methodology was described in 2005 by Candace Loewen as follows: "….it is both theory and strategy; it involves a top-down approach; it is research-based; it demands an analysis of functions (structures) before records; archival value is primarily found in the evidence of functions; representations of contemporary society form the documentary heritage; future researcher use is unimportant; and ‘‘hot spots’’ are found in the interaction between citizen and state.") Formal recognition includes:

- 2007: Fellow of the Australian Society of Archivists
- 2010: Emmett Leahy Award

The Emmett Leahy Award was given to recognize Cunningham's work in the National Archives of Australia and the International Council on Archives to promote collaboration in improving the practice of electronic records and information management, including leadership in developing the ICA's Principles and Functional Requirements for Records in Electronic Environments. In accepting the Emmett Leahy Award, Cunningham said,

... we should not lose sight of those things that probably first attracted us to records work; ... the sense that somehow the spirits of human beings now departed can yet resonate through the written artefacts of their lives.

In November 2019 Simon Chu, Adrian Cunningham and Nolda Römer-Kenepa were awarded Fellowships by the International Council on Archives.

== Publications ==
Cunningham has written more than 60 articles on archives and recordkeeping standards. His publications include:

- Cunningham, Adrian (1996), "Ensuring Essential Evidence", National Library of Australia News, vol. 7, no. 2, pp. 6–8
- Cunningham, Adrian (1996), "Journey to the End of the Night: Custody and the Dawning of a New Era on the Archival Threshold", Archives and Manuscripts, vol. 24, no. 2, pp. 312–321
- Cunningham, Adrian (1999), Horsman, P.J.; Ketelaar, F.C.J.; Thomassen, T.H. (eds.), "Dynamic Descriptions: Australian Strategies for the Intellectual Control of Records and Recordkeeping Systems", Naar een nieuw paradigma in de archivistiek, The Hague: Stichting Archiefpublicaties, pp. 133–42
- Cunningham, Adrian (2005), McKemmish, Sue; Piggott, Michael; Reed, Barbara; Upward, Frank (eds.), "Archival Institutions", Archives: Recordkeeping in Society, Wagga Wagga: Charles Stun University, pp. 21–50
- Scott, Peter J. (2010), Cunningham, Adrian (ed.), The Arrangement and Description of Archives amid Administrative and Technological Change: Essays and Reflections, Brisbane: Australian Society of Archivists
- Cunningham, Adrian (2010), "The Government 2.0 Taskforce 2009: Recordkeeping Issues and Opportunities", Archives and Manuscripts, vol. 38, no. 2 (November), pp. 20–36
- Cunningham, Adrian (2011), Let, Christopher A. (ed.), "Ghosts in the Machine: Towards a Principles-Based Approach to Making and Keeping Personal Digital Records", Digital: Personal Collections in the Digital Era, Chicago: Society of American Archivists, pp. 78–89
- Cunningham, Adrian (2011), "Good Digital Records Don't Just 'Happen': Embedding Digital Recordkeeping as an Organic Component of Business Processes and Systems", Archivaria, no. 71 (Spring), pp. 21–33
- Cunningham, Adrian (2014), "Eternity Revisited: In Pursuit of a National Documentation Strategy and a National Archival System", Archives and Manuscripts, vol. 42, no. 2, pp. 165–170
- Cunningham, Adrian; Oswald, Robyn (2005), "Some Functions Are Morc Equal Than Others: The Development of a Macroappraisal Strategy for the National Archives of Australia", Archival Science, vol. 5, no. 2–4, pp. 163–184

== Sources ==
- 2010 Emmett Leahy Award Winner, Ardian Cunningham, Emmett Leahy Award
- Anderson, Karen (January 2008), The archives industry perspectives on Significance as a collections management tool (PDF), Collections Council of Australia Workshop on Significance 2
- Farewell Adrian Cunningham, Queensland State Archives, 15 January 2017
- Hill, Jennie (2011), "Adrian Cunningham", The Future of Archives and Recordkeeping: A Reader, Facet Publishing, ISBN 978-1-85604-666-4
- Piggott, Michael (22 October 2012), Archives and Societal Provenance: Australian Essays, Elsevier Science, ISBN 978-1-78063-378-7
- Reed, Barbara (26 April 2019), "Adrian Cunningham (1960–)", in Duranti, Luciana; Franks, Patricia C. (eds.), Encyclopedia of Archival Writers, 1515 - 2015, Rowman & Littlefield Publishers, ISBN 978-1-5381-2580-9
- Simon Chu, Adrian Cunningham and Nolda Römer-Kenepa awarded ICA Fellowship, ICA, 25 November 2019
