= Bob Cunningham =

Bob Cunningham may refer to:

- Bob Cunningham (Canadian football) (1927–2006), Canadian football fullback
- Bob Cunningham (ice hockey) (born 1941), Canadian ice hockey centre
- Bob Cunningham (musician) (1934–2017), American jazz double-bassist

== See also ==
- Robert Cunningham (disambiguation)
