= Hugh Cunningham =

Hugh Cunningham may refer to:

- Hugh Cunningham (British Army officer)
- Hugh Cunningham of Bonnington, Lord Provost of Edinburgh
- Hugh Cunningham (historian)
