= Cuninghame =

Cuninghame is a surname, and may refer to:

- Polly Cuninghame (c.1785–1837), Dutch dancer
- Rob Robertson-Cuninghame (1924–2010), Australian pastoralist and academic
- Robert Cuninghame, 1st Baron Rossmore (1726–1801) was an Irish officer of the British Army and politician
- Sir Thomas Montgomery-Cuninghame, 10th Baronet (1877–1945), British Army officer
- William Cuninghame of Lainshaw (c.1775–1849), Scottish landowner and writer on biblical prophecy
- Sir William Montgomery-Cuninghame, 9th Baronet (1834–1897), British Army officer and politician

== See also ==
- Cuningham
- Cunninghame (surname)
