= Harry Cunningham (baseball) =

Professional baseball player

- Pitcher

Negro league baseball debut
- 1930, for the Memphis Red Sox

Last appearance
- 1937, for the Memphis Red Sox
- Stats at Baseball Reference

Teams
- Memphis Red Sox (1930–1932, 1937)

Harry Cunningham was a Negro league pitcher in the 1930s.

Cunningham made his Negro leagues debut in 1930 with the Memphis Red Sox. He played with Memphis through 1932, and made a brief appearance for the club again in 1937.
