= Mary Ann Cunningham =

Canadian temperance activist (1841–1930)

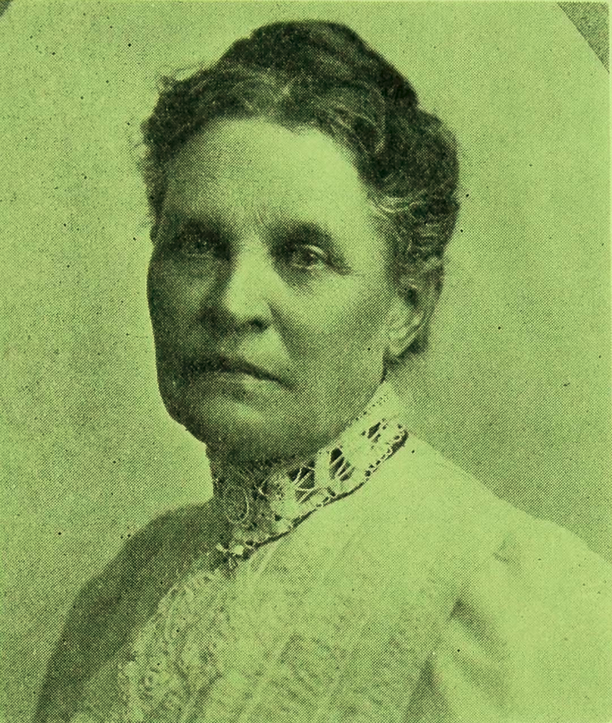
- Mary Ann Cunningham
- Born: Mary Ann Woodman; 19 July 1841; St. Thomas, Ontario
- Died: 22 January 1930 (aged 88); New Westminster, British Columbia
- Spouse: James Cunningham (m. 1864; died 1925)
- Children: 5

Mary Ann Cunningham (née, Woodman; July 19, 1841 – January 22, 1930) was a Canadian temperance activist. She was a leader in the provincial and local Woman's Christian Temperance Union (WCTU), being a member for 40 years, and holding office for 31 years.

== Early life and education ==
Mary Ann Woodman was born in St. Thomas in Elgin County, Ontario, July 19, 1841. (Note: Cherrington (1924) gives Cunningham's place of birth as Yarmouth, Elgin County, Ontario.) Her parents were William and Mary Ann (Pugh) Woodman.

She was educated at St. Thomas Central and Grammar Schools.

== Career ==
Cunningham was a teacher in St. Thomas Central School for two years. She was also a writer of newspaper articles and personal sketches for publication in pamphlet form.

She moved to British Columbia in 1862, and three years later, married James Cunningham (1834–1925), of New Westminster, in that province. Their children were Herbert, Fred, Maud, Alice and Frances.

Her first temperance work was the organizing of a temperance band among the young people of that town. In 1883 the Woman's Christian Temperance Union (WCTU) was organized in British Columbia. Cunningham was elected first president of the New Westminster Union, and she was re-elected annually for twelve years. In 1885, at the third provincial WCTU convention, she was elected president of the provincial Union, holding the position until 1893 when she was made provincial corresponding secretary. Besides actively cooperating with the Dominion Alliance and other temperance societies, she presided over a large Band of Hope and Loyal Legion, under the auspices of the local WCTU. In 1909, she was elected first vice-president, and six years later honorary president of the provincial WCTU. She was also a member of the sub-executive committee. She attended every provincial WCTU convention since 1885, and took a leading part in the movements of the People's Prohibition Association, the object of which was to secure the enforcement of the Prohibition Act and to obtain amendments when it was found necessary to do so. Writing from her home in New Westminster, B.C. in October, 1923, Mrs. Cunningham said: “I have been a member of the provincial WCTU 40 years, and have held office for 31 years.”

She was the founder and eight years president of the Managing Board of Women's Hospital (under the auspices of the local WCTU), later amalgamated with the Royal Columbian Hospital. For 16 years, with another woman, Cunningham visited and preached to the prisoners in the New Westminster jail, holding regular Sunday afternoon services in the jail chapel. She favored woman suffrage.

Cunningham served as president and secretary of other societies such as the Ladies Aid, Woman's Mission Society, and Woman's Council. Cunningham served as director and honorary president of the YWCA. She was a member of the Political Equality League and the Educational Club.

== Personal life ==
In religion, Cunningham belonged to the Canadian Methodist Church. She was a member of Queen's Avenue Methodist Church, New Westminster, since June, 1862, and ever since, taught in its Sunday school, which gave her a jubilee June, 1913. She was a Methodist church class leader, and mission worker.

Mary Ann Cunningham died at her residence in New Westminster, January 22, 1930. Interment was at the I.O.O.F. Cemetery, New Westminster.
