= Edwin Cunningham =

Edwin Cunningham may refer to:

- Edwin Cunningham (diplomat) (1868–1953), United States diplomat
- Edwin Cunningham (footballer) (1919–1993), English professional footballer
- Edwin Wilber Cunningham (1842–1905), Justice of the Kansas Supreme Court
