= Redmond Cunningham =

British Army officer

Major Redmond Christopher Archer Cunningham MC and Bar, Croix de Guerre (25 December 1916 – 1 December 1999), was one of the most highly decorated Irish officers serving in the British army during World War II and was the only Irishman to receive the Military Cross on D-Day. After the war, 'The Major', as he became known, married and became a successful architect in his home town of Waterford. An unrepentant bon vivant with a nose for a flutter, Cunningham led a colourful life.

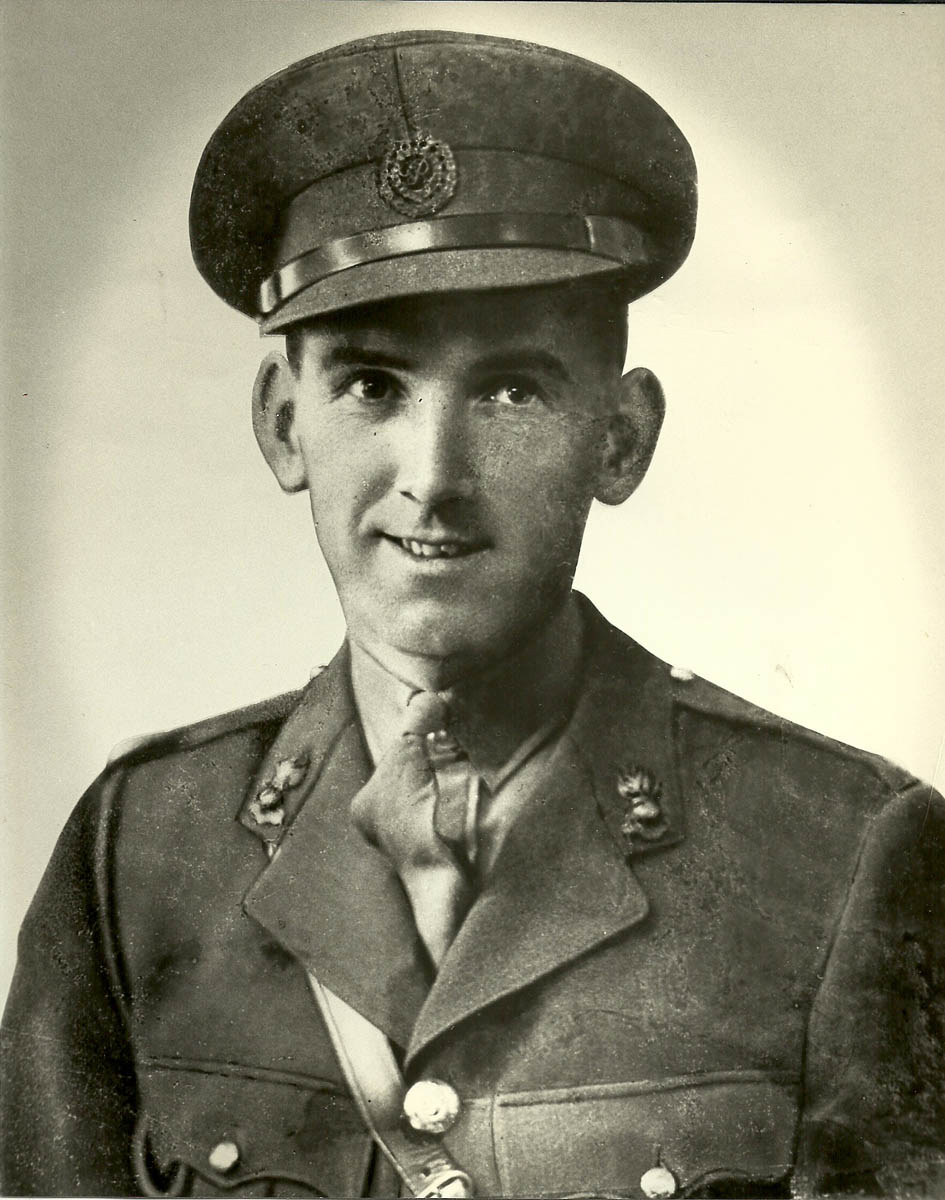
Redmond Cunningham

== Early Days ==
Cunningham was born to a large family in the Ballybricken area of Waterford City on Christmas Day in 1916. Brought up in the middle of 15 (13 survived childhood), Cunningham was schooled at the Clongowes Wood College and was named after his godfather John Redmond, the former leader of Ireland's Home Rule party. Cunningham's father was an election agent for the Home Rule party in Waterford and a staunch supporter of its goals.

== Second World War ==
Badge of the 79th Armoured Division

Yearning for adventure and a change from the parochial monotony that characterised Free State Ireland, Cunningham joined the British Army in 1943 in Belfast. An experienced architectural draughtsman, Cunningham entered the army as a second lieutenant in the 79th Armoured Division of the Royal Engineers. He was immediately sent to Scotland where preparations for D-Day were nearing completion. Under the genial command of Major General P.C Hobart, the 79th Armoured had rethought hitherto customary tank design in preparation for the beachhead onslaught against the German Atlantic Wall in Normandy. With innovative tank designs specifically attuned to short range beach fighting, and new training methods, Hobart's division were soon famed in army circles. His esoteric tanks quickly earned the nickname Hobart's Funnies. Although something of a laughing stock at the time, and refused by the American command, some of the tanks proved quite useful and the beaches where they were deployed suffered fewer casualties than others.

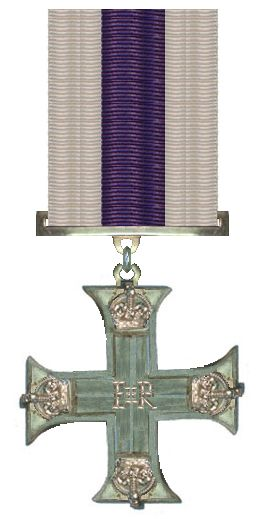
Military Cross

After a furtive sojourn to some London pubs with a close friend on the night of 5 June, Cunningham landed in Normandy the next morning as part of the first attack wave. Seasick, cold, and nursing a hangover, Cunningham landed at 07:00 on 'Queen Red' beach, the code name for Ouistreham, with the rest of his unit. Almost immediately seeing his good friend Geofferey Desanges fall, Cunningham threw himself and his tank into battle. His tank was hit within minutes of landing by heavy German mortar fire. He went on to fight in three further tanks that morning before reorganising the unit and clearing the mined beach. Army dispatches record Cunningham removing mines under heavy fire with his hands. With the mines cleared, he then led his men to the German defences and captured some 90 German soldiers. His quick thinking and selfless actions on D-Day and 7 June, when he supervised the capture of the lock at Ouistreham, allowed the infantry from the 2nd Battalion of the Royal Ulster Rifles to push inland. His bravery on D-Day and D-Day+1 was recognised with the Military Cross award.

He was awarded a bar to his cross later that year at Nijmegen in the Battle of the Scheldt, where he led an assault on German positions, capturing some 200 prisoners. It was there that Cunningham received the shrapnel wounds which he was to carry with him for the rest of his life.

He was further awarded a Croix de Guerre by the Belgian government for his part in rescuing civilians in Antwerp following a German V1 attack on the centre of that city.

== Post-war ==
Cunningham returned home to Ireland from Germany in 1946 and married the impish Mory McIntyre, a well known amateur golfer who had paired with Joe Carr on a number of occasions. Redmond Cunningham was to become a successful architect and businessman who stubbornly remained devoted to his wife, his Roman Catholic faith, racetracks and his children up until his peaceful death on 1 December 1999.

He is survived by his son Peter Cunningham, a critically acclaimed author and member of the Aosdána, his daughter Rhoda Cunningham, a photographer, his son Dama Cunningham, a business consultant, and Patricia Cunningham, a stained glass artist and Bray's Gourmand Laureate. His daughter Pigeon, aka Subarata, now deceased, was an ultra-distance runner, clown, and junk-food fan. She was a devoted disciple of Sri Chinmoy.
