= Allan Cunningham =

Allan, Alan or Allen Cunningham may refer to:

- Alan Cunningham (1887–1983), World War II general
- Allan Cunningham (author) (1784–1842), Scottish poet and author
- Allan Cunningham (botanist) (1791–1839), British botanist and explorer
- Allan Cunningham Anderson (1896–?), Canadian diplomat
- Allan J. C. Cunningham (1842–1928), mathematician
- Allen Cunningham (born 1977), American professional poker player
- M. Allen Cunningham (born 1978), American author
