= Ralph E. Cunningham Jr. =

American politician (1925–2007)

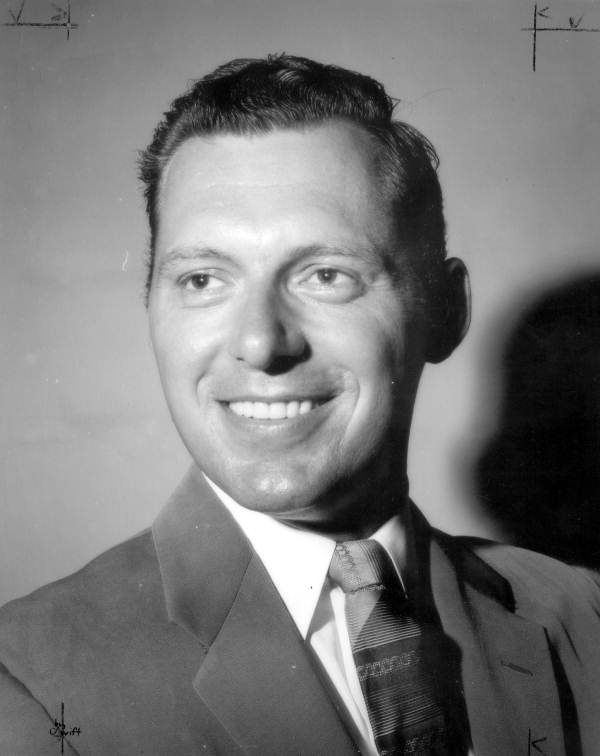
- Cunningham in 1959

Member of the Florida House of Representatives from Monroe County
- In office 1959

Personal details
- Born: May 12, 1925 Hackensack, New Jersey, U.S.
- Died: April 29, 2007 (aged 81) Marathon, Florida, U.S.
- Party: Democratic
- Education: University of Toledo; University of Miami

Ralph E. Cunningham Jr. (May 12, 1925 – April 29, 2007) was an American politician. He served as a Democratic member of the Florida House of Representatives.

== Life and career ==
Cunningham was born in Hackensack, New Jersey. He attended the University of Toledo and the University of Miami.

Cunningham served in the Florida House of Representatives in 1959.

Cunningham died on April 29, 2007, in Marathon, Florida, at the age of 81.
