= Charles J. Cunningham =

United States Air Force general (1932–2022)

Charles Cunningham
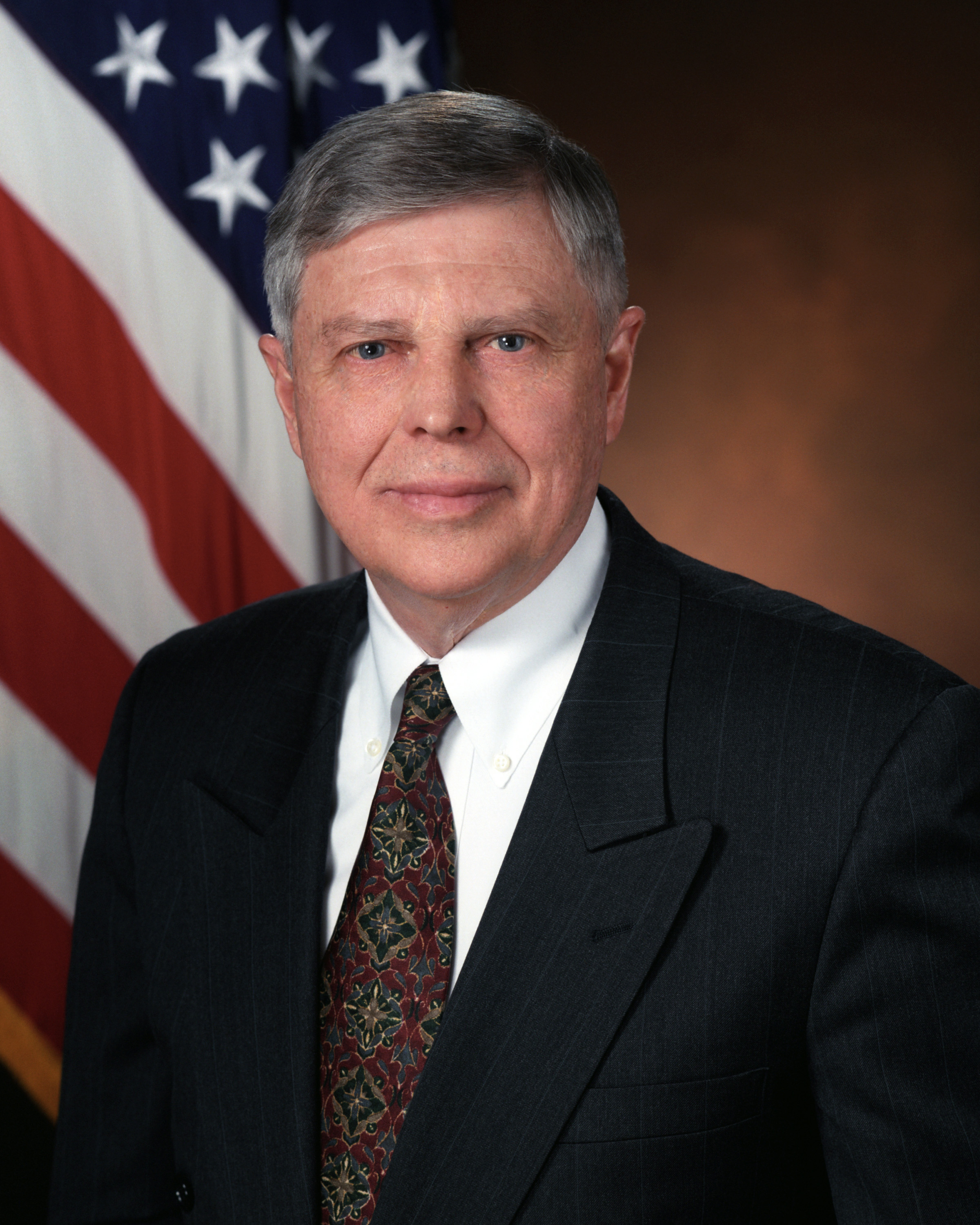
- Cunningham as Deputy Assistant Secretary of Defense for Intelligence in March 1999
- Born: July 19, 1932; Philadelphia, Pennsylvania, U.S.
- Died: November 17, 2022 (aged 90); Virginia Beach, Virginia, U.S.
- Military career
- Allegiance: United States of America
- Branch: United States Air Force
- Service years: 1954–1987
- Rank: Lieutenant general
- Commands: Defense Security Service; Twelfth Air Force; 57th Fighter Weapons Wing; 56th Tactical Fighter Wing; 480th Tactical Fighter Squadron
- Conflicts: Vietnam War
- Awards: Distinguished Service Medal; Legion of Merit (2); Distinguished Flying Cross (8); Bronze Star Medal; Meritorious Service Medal (2); Air Medal (28)

Charles J. Cunningham Jr. (July 19, 1932 – November 17, 2022) was a lieutenant general in the U.S. Air Force. His last post in the Air Force was as the commander of the Twelfth Air Force, Tactical Air Command at Bergstrom Air Force Base, Texas. After his retirement from the military he served as director of the Defense Security Service until 2002. While working for the U.S. Department of Defense he held several executive positions within the Office of the Secretary of Defense and the Defense Intelligence Agency.

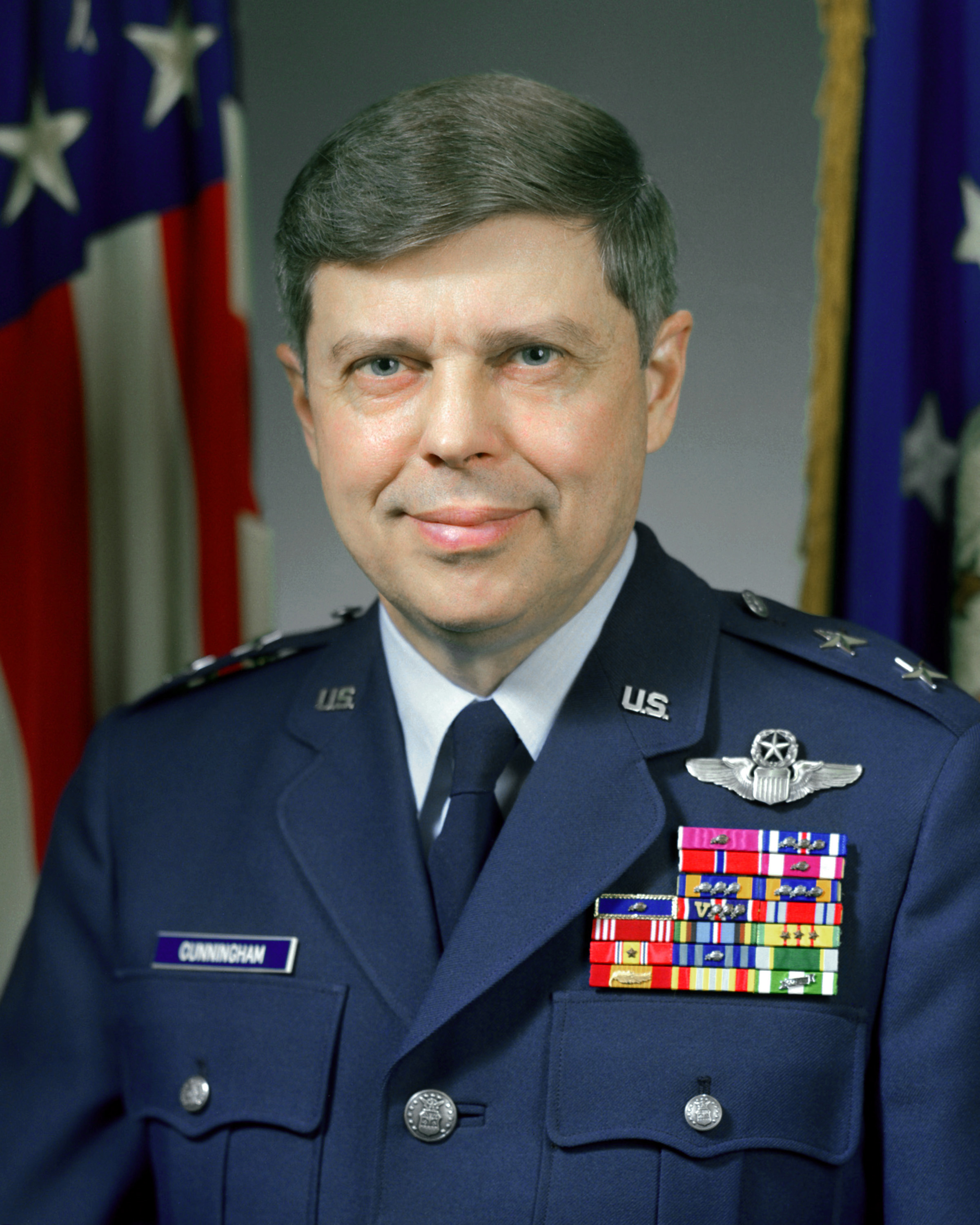
Cunningham as a major general in November 1982

Prior to the Tactical Air Command he served as a deputy chief of staff at the U.S. Air Force Headquarters. Cunningham also served as deputy director for programs and evaluation.

Cunningham joined the Air Force as an aviation cadet in June 1954 and was commissioned as a second lieutenant after completing navigator training in August 1955. He later completed pilot training in April 1960. During a series of assignments in the United States, Cunningham also earned a bachelor's degree in 1957 and an M.B.A. degree in 1965. In October 1965, he began his first overseas assignment at Hahn Air Base in Germany flying the F-100 Super Sabre.

In June 1967, Cunningham began the first of two combat tours in Vietnam flying the F-4 Phantom. He served with the 389th Tactical Fighter Squadron and the 480th Tactical Fighter Squadron in Vietnam and the 34th Tactical Fighter Squadron in Thailand flying 366 combat missions in Southeast Asia. Cunningham was awarded eight Distinguished Flying Crosses, one Bronze Star Medal and 28 Air Medals. He died on November 17, 2022, in Virginia Beach, Virginia.

== Education ==
- Bachelor's degree in Political Science from Florida State University in 1957.
- Master's degree in Business Administration from George Washington University in 1965.
- Doctorate in Public Administration from Nova Southeastern University in 1976.
