= Graeme Cunningham (footballer) =

Scottish footballer (1922–2018)

Personal information
- Full name: Graeme McCreath Cunningham
- Date of birth: 28 December 1922
- Place of birth: Largs, Scotland
- Date of death: 2018 (aged 95)
- Place of death: West Sussex, England
- Position: Outside forward

Senior career*
Years	Team	Apps	(Gls)
1947–1951	Queen's Park	83	(28)
- Romford
1954–1956	Hendon	36	(12)
- * Club domestic league appearances and goals

Graeme McCreath Cunningham (28 December 1922 – 2018) was a Scottish amateur footballer, best remembered for his time as an outside forward in the Scottish League with Queen's Park. He also played non-League football for Romford and Hendon.

== Career statistics ==
Appearances and goals by club, season and competition
Club	Season	League			National Cup		League Cup		Other		Total	
Club	Season	Division	Apps	Goals	Apps	Goals	Apps	Goals	Apps	Goals	Apps	Goals
Queen's Park	1947–48	Scottish First Division	18	8	2	0	0	0	0	0	20	8
Queen's Park	1948–49	Scottish Second Division	30	12	1	0	6	1	3 (Note: 1 appearance in B Division Supplementary Cup, 1 appearance in Glasgow Cup, 1 appearance in Glasgow Merchants Charity Cup)	0	40	13
Queen's Park	1949–50	Scottish Second Division	19	6	0	0	5	2	2 (Note: 1 appearance in Glasgow Cup, 1 appearance in Glasgow Merchants Charity Cup)	0	26	8
Queen's Park	1950–51	Scottish Second Division	16	2	0	0	4	0	0	0	20	2
Queen's Park	Total		83	28	3	0	15	3	5	0	106	31
Hendon	1954–55	Athenian League	18	5	4	1	—		16 (Note: 8 appearances and 3 goals in FA Amateur Cup, 4 appearances and 6 goals in London Senior Cup, 3 appearances and 2 goals in Middlesex Senior Charity Cup, 1 appearance and 1 goal in Middlesex Senior Cup)	12	38	18
Hendon	1955–56	Athenian League	18	7	2	0	—		7 (Note: 2 appearances and 1 goal in London Senior Cup, 2 appearances in Middlesex Senior Cup, 1 appearance and 1 goal in London Challenge Cup, 1 appearance in FA Amateur Cup, 1 appearance in London Charity Cup)	2	27	9
Hendon	Total		36	12	6	1	—		23	14	65	27
Career total			119	40	9	1	15	3	28	14	171	58

== Honours ==
Hendon

- Athenian League: 1955–56
- Middlesex Senior Cup: 1955–56
