= Graeme Cunningham (cricketer) =

Australian cricketer (born 1975)

Personal information
- Full name: Graeme Timothy Cunningham
- Born: 25 January 1975 (age 51); Goulburn, New South Wales, Australia
- Nickname: Champ
- Batting: Right-handed
- Bowling: Right-arm off-break

Domestic team information
- Years: Team
- 1998/99–1999/00: Australian Capital Territory
- 2000/01–2002/03: Tasmania

Career statistics
Competition	First-class	List A
Matches	2	35
Runs scored	40	856
Batting average	10.00	26.75
100s/50s	0/0	0/5
Top score	40	77
Catches/stumpings	0/–	10/–
- Source: CricketArchive, 15 August 2010

Graeme Timothy Cunningham (born 25 January 1975) is a retired Australian cricketer who played predominantly for Tasmania.

Cunningham was born at Goulburn, New South Wales in 1975. He was an effective middle order batsman. More a hard hitting slogger than a stylist, he began his cricketing career with promise, performing well in New South Wales colts and under-age sides. Unable to get into the New South Wales Blues, he tried for the Canberra Comets instead. He played for Canberra until they withdrew from the ING Cup, and then transferred to Tasmania.
