= John Francis Cunningham (surgeon) =

- Born: September 25, 1875
- Died: July 13, 1932 (aged 56)
- Occupation: Ophthalmic surgeon

John Francis Cunningham OBE FRCS (25 September 1875 - 13 July 1932) was a British Ophthalmic surgeon.
