= Condorito: Alcalde =

- Official logo
- Directed by: Eduardo Schuldt
- Based on: Condorito by René "Pepo" Ríos
- Distributed by: Chaska Entertainment
- Release date: 2027
- Countries: Chile; Peru
- Language: Spanish

Condorito: Alcalde (formerly known as Condorito 2: En Pelotillehue) is an upcoming animated film directed by Eduardo Schuldt and based on the Condorito comic strip; it is the sequel to Condorito: la película. The film will be released in early 2027.

== Development ==
On July 29, 2020, during the COVID-19 pandemic, RPP Noticias announced that a sequel to Condorito: la película, also directed by Eduardo Schuldt. was in development. In an interview with the newspaper Correo, Schuldt revealed that the sequel would be set in Pelotillehue and feature all the characters from the comic strip.

On June 23, 2025, the teaser for the sequel was leaked, confirming the title: Condorito 2: En Pelotillehue.

On July 31, 2025, the company's webpage officially released the trailer, giving it the title: Condorito: Alcalde.
