= Condorito: la película =

2017 animated film

- Theatrical release poster
- Directed by: Alex Orrelle; Eduardo Schuldt
- Screenplay by: Rodrigo Moraes; Martín Piroyansky; Ishai Ravid
- Based on: Condorito by René "Pepo" Ríos
- Produced by: Hugo Rose; Abraham Vurnbrand
- Starring: Omar Chaparro; Jéssica Cediel; Cristián de la Fuente
- Edited by: Pablo García Revert
- Music by: Fran Revert
- Production companies: Aronnax Animation Studios; Pajarraco Films, LLC
- Distributed by: 20th Century Fox
- Release date: October 12, 2017
- Running time: 88 minutes
- Countries: Chile; Peru; Mexico; Argentina
- Language: Spanish
- Budget: $8 million
- Box office: $8.3 million

Condorito: la película (released internationally as Space Chicken) is a 2017 animated adventure comedy film based on the comic book series of the same name by Pepo. The film features the voices of Omar Chaparro, Jéssica Cediel, and Cristián de la Fuente. It is a co-production between the countries of Chile, Mexico, Argentina and Peru.

The film was first released in Latin America on 12 October 2017 in 2D and 3D formats, distributed by 20th Century Fox, where the film was a box office success in many countries within the region.

The film was released in the United States on 12 January 2018 by Pantelion Films.

== Plot ==
Many years ago, mollusk-like aliens enslaved planets with their hypnotic amulet. However, during the pre-Columbian era, an anthropomorphic condor immune to hypnosis stole the amulet, de-hypnotizing the humans and causing the aliens to retreat to their planet, but with a promise to return. The Condor and his friends hid the amulet in a temple in a Mexican jungle, and over the years, the Condor had several descendants.

In the present day, in Pelotillehue city, Condorito and his friends win a soccer match against Buenas Peras team. During an interview, Condorito flirts with reporters, leading to Yayita electrocuting him and leaving with Pepe Cortisona to buy a hot air balloon for Tremebunda's birthday, Yayita's mother.

Meanwhile, Coné receives a video call from Emperor Molosco, who wishes to take over the galaxy. Condorito mistakes him for a phone company provider and makes a deal with him to kidnap Doña Tremebunda in exchange for finding the amulet. During Tremebunda's 59th birthday party, her husband Don Cuasimodo accidentally burns her cake and gifts her an electric razor. Later, Condorito gives Yayita the same razor, which angers Tremebunda. As they are interrupted by an extraterrestrial ship, Condorito realizes the misunderstanding and tells Molosco he didn't want him to take Tremebunda. Molosco gives him 24 hours to find the amulet, or he won't see Tremebunda again. Yayita is angry with Condorito for kidnapping her mother and separates from him.

Forced to search for the amulet to rescue his mother-in-law, Condorito travels to Condor Tihuacan with Coné to find the Catacombs of Death, where the amulet is protected by his ancestors. He retrieves the amulet and gives it to Molosco, who reveals his intention to conquer Tremebunda, make her his empress, and invade Earth. Condorito travels into space to save Tremebunda while his friends keep Yayita away from Pepe Cortisona.

== Voice cast ==
- Condorito, a clumsy and dim-witted condor who journeys to stop Molosco to save both Earth and his future mother-in-law. Voiced by Omar Chaparro (Spanish); Tom Fahn (English).
- Yayita, a beautiful young lady, Tremebunda and Cuasimodo's daughter and Condorito's love interest. Voiced by Jéssica Cediel (Spanish); Allegra Clark (English).
- Pepe Cortisona, a handsome man who is Yayita's former love interest, and Condorito's arch-rival. He has a hatred for children. Voiced by Cristián de la Fuente (Spanish); Chris Tergliafera (English).
- Doña Tremebunda, Yayita's mother and Molosco's former wife, who despises Condorito for falling in love with her daughter. Legrand also voiced her husband Cuasimodo, Yayita's father. Voiced by Coco Legrand (Spanish); Michael Sorich (English).
- Coné, Condorito's adventure-loving little nephew who helps his uncle during their adventure. Voiced by Mauricio Lopez (Spanish); Michelle Ruff (English).
- Emperor Molosco, An evil alien that is Tremebunda's former husband and Condorito's arch-nemesis. Voiced by Jey Mammón (Spanish); Cam Clarke (credited as Ren Mortensen) (English).

== Release ==
The film was released in Latin America by 20th Century Fox beginning on October 12, 2017, and in the United States on January 12, 2018, by Pantelion Films. Sola Media handled international sales.

=== Box office ===
The film performed well in Latin American countries, grossing at least $1 million in Chile, Mexico, Peru, and Colombia, making it the most-watched animated film in the region.

=== Critical reception ===
The film received generally mixed reviews from critics. On the review aggregator website Rotten Tomatoes, 33% of 6 critics' reviews are positive, with an average rating of 5.3/10.

== Accolades ==
Alex Orrelle and Eduardo Schuldt were nominated at the 2018 Quirino Awards in the category Best Ibero-American Animation Feature Film.

== Sequel ==
On 29 July 2020, RPP Noticias announced that a sequel to Condorito: la película was in development, with Eduardo Schuldt returning to direct. During an interview with Diario Correo, Schuldt revealed that the sequel will be set in Pelotillehue and It will include all the characters from the comic. The sequel is scheduled for release in late 2026 or early 2027.

On June 23, 2025, the teaser for the sequel was leaked, confirming the title: Condorito 2: En Pelotillehue.

On July 31, 2025, the company's webpage officially released the trailer, giving it the title: Condorito: Alcalde.
