= Eduardo Schuldt =

Peruvian filmmaker

- Born: May 22, 1972 (age 54); Lima, Perú
- Occupations: Film director animator
- Years active: 2003–present
- Notable work: Pirates in Callao (2005); Condorito: la película (2017)

Eduardo Schuldt (born May 22, 1972) is a Peruvian animator and filmmaker, best known for directing animated feature films like Pirates in Callao, The Illusionauts, Condorito: la película, A Giant Adventure, and Milagros: An Extraordinary Bear. Schuldt has also directed over a hundred television commercials and created 3D experiences for various amusement parks.

== Career ==
=== First projects ===
Schuldt made his feature film directorial debut with Pirates in Callao (2005), the first Peruvian 3D animated film. The following year, he directed Dragones: Destino de fuego, a film inspired by the book of the same name by economist and writer Hernán Garrido-Lecca.

In 2009, he directed The Dolphin: Story of a Dreamer, based on the novel by Peruvian author Sergio Bambarén Roggero, followed by Lars y el misterio del portal (2011). That same year, media outlets announced that Schuldt would direct Gogo's Crazy Bones, recognized by RPP Noticias as the first animated series produced in Peru. In 2012, he directed The Illusionauts, which became the highest-grossing Peruvian film of that year, earning over $740,000.

Schuldt temporarily moved away from animation to explore the horror genre with The Entity (2015), Peru's first 3D horror feature, which follows a group of students who discover a dark secret while filming a documentary. That same year, he directed El cascanueces, an animated film based on the book by E.T.A. Hoffmann; the international version featured the voices of actors Ed Asner and Alicia Silverstone.

=== Condorito: The Movie and recent work ===
Also in 2015, reports surfaced that Schuldt was developing an animated film about Condorito, the comic character created by Chilean cartoonist Pepo. The film, co-directed by Schuldt and Alex Orrelle and distributed by 20th Century Fox, was released in October 2017. Following the film's box-office success, Schuldt confirmed in 2020 that a sequel was in development.

In 2023, Schuldt released two new animated features: A Giant Adventure, which tells the story of two young people who encounter pre-Hispanic deities in the Nazca Lines region, and Milagros: An Extraordinary Bear, based on the literary work by Hernán Garrido-Lecca.

In 2024, he released the sequel to Pirates in Callao (titled Piratas del Callao: El Regreso de L'Hermite) using a virtual reality format branded as Adventure Cinema.

== Filmography ==
Year	Title	Role
2005	Pirates in Callao	Director
2006	Dragones: destino de fuego	Director
2009	The Dolphin: Story of a Dreamer	Director, screenwriter
2011	Lars y el misterio del portal	Director
2011	Gogo's Crazy Bones	Director
2012	The Illusionauts	Director
2015	The Entity	Director, producer
2015	El cascanueces	Director
2015	El beneficio de la duda	Producer
2017	Condorito: la película	Co-director
2023	A Giant Adventure	Director
2023	Milagros: An Extraordinary Bear	Director
2024	Piratas del Callao: El Regreso de L'Hermite	Director
2027	Condorito: Alcalde	Director
