= Fort Church =

Fort Church may refer to:

- Fort Church (Rhode Island), a World War II US coast defense fort
- Fort Church, Bangalore, a fortified church 1808-1933
- Fort Church, Curaçao, a church inside Fort Amsterdam in Willemstad
