= Saludos Amigos =

1943 film

- Theatrical release poster
- Directed by: Supervising Director: Norm Ferguson; Segment Directors: Wilfred Jackson (Aquarela do Brasil); Jack Kinney (El Gaucho Goofy); Ham Luske (Pedro); Bill Roberts (Lake Titicaca)
- Story by: Homer Brightman; William Cottrell; Richard Huemer; Joe Grant; Harold Reeves; Ted Sears; Webb Smith; Roy Williams; Ralph Wright
- Based on: Donald & Goofy by Walt Disney; Dick Lundy; Art Babbitt; Frank Webb; Pinto Colvig
- Produced by: Walt Disney
- Music by: Paul Smith; Edward H. Plumb
- Production company: Walt Disney Productions
- Distributed by: RKO Radio Pictures
- Release dates: August 24, 1942 (Rio de Janeiro); February 6, 1943 (Boston); February 19, 1943 (United States)
- Running time: 42 minutes
- Country: United States
- Languages: English; Portuguese; Spanish
- Box office: $1 million (worldwide rentals)

Saludos Amigos (Spanish for "Greetings, Friends") is a 1942 American live-action/animated anthology film produced by Walt Disney and released by RKO Radio Pictures. Set in Latin America, the featurette is made up of four different segments; Donald Duck stars in two of them and Goofy stars in one. It also features the first appearance of José Carioca, the malandro Brazilian parrot. Saludos Amigos premiered in Rio de Janeiro on August 24, 1942. It was released in the United States on February 19, 1943.

The film was a success, helping launch the international popularity of Donald Duck and leading Disney to produce The Three Caballeros (1944), another government-funded film aimed at Latin American goodwill.

== Background ==
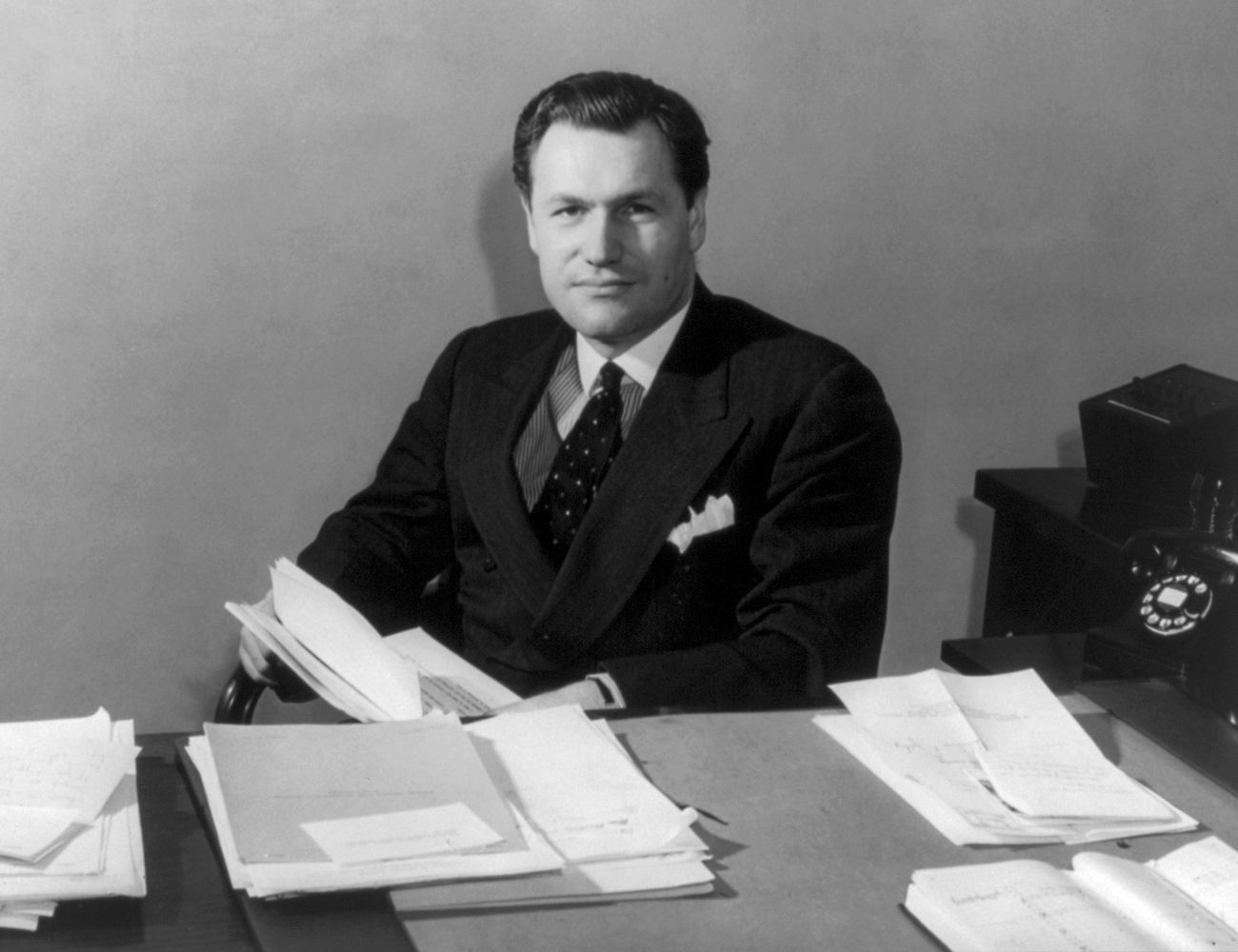
Nelson Rockefeller, Coordinator of Inter-American Affairs (1940)

In early 1941, before U.S. entry into World War II, the United States Department of State commissioned a Disney goodwill tour of South America, intended to lead to a movie to be shown in the US, Central, and South America as part of the Good Neighbor Policy. It was being done because several Latin American governments had close ties with Nazi Germany, and the US government wanted to counteract those ties. Mickey Mouse and other Disney characters were popular in Latin America, and Walt Disney acted as ambassador. The tour, facilitated by Nelson Rockefeller, who had recently been appointed as Coordinator of Inter-American Affairs (CIAA), took Disney and a group of roughly twenty composers, artists, technicians, etc. from his studio to South America, mainly to Brazil and Argentina, but also to Chile, Bolivia and Peru.

The film itself was given federal loan guarantees, because the Disney studio had over-expanded just before European markets were closed to them by the war, and because Disney was struggling with labor unrest at the time (including a strike that was underway at the time the goodwill journey began).

The film included live-action documentary sequences featuring footage of modern Latin American cities with skyscrapers and fashionably dressed residents. It surprised many contemporary US viewers, who associated such images only with US and European cities, and contributed to a changing impression of Latin America. Film historian Alfred Charles Richard Jr. has commented that Saludos Amigos "did more to cement a community of interest between peoples of the Americas in a few months than the State Department had in fifty years."

The film also inspired Chilean cartoonist René Ríos Boettiger to create Condorito, one of Latin America's most ubiquitous cartoon characters. Ríos perceived that the character Pedro, a small, incapable airplane, was a slight to Chileans and created a comic that could supposedly rival Disney's comic characters.

Plot

The film features segments of 5 countries in South America: Peru, Bolivia, Argentina, Chile, and Brazil. Each country has its own segment except for Bolivia and Peru, because both countries are represented in the Lake Titicaca segment.

== Film segments ==
The main feature film features four different segments, each of which begin with various clips of the Disney artists roaming the country, drawing cartoons of some of the local cultures and scenery they see.

=== Lake Titicaca ===
In the segment, the Disney artists make a cartoon where Donald Duck visits Lake Titicaca in Bolivia and Peru and meets some of the locals, including an obstinate llama as an American tourist. When Donald tries to ride the llama over a bridge, he ends up falling into the sea and rows away in pots and pans.

=== Pedro ===
Pedro is a story about a small anthropomorphic airplane from an airport near Santiago, Chile, engaging in his first flight to retrieve air mail from Mendoza, with disastrous consequences. He manages to safely return to the airfield with the mail, which happens to be a single postcard. RKO Pictures released the particular segment as a theatrical short on May 13, 1955.

Chilean cartoonist René Ríos Boettiger (known popularly as "Pepo") was disappointed with how the character Pedro represented his country. In response, he developed the character Condorito, who went on to become one of the most iconic comic magazine characters in Latin America.

=== El Gaucho Goofy ===
In the segment, American cowboy Goofy gets taken from Texas to the Argentinian pampas by the Narrator to learn the ways of the native gaucho. The segment was later edited for the film's Gold Classic Collection VHS/DVD release to remove one scene in which Goofy is shown smoking a cigarette. The edit appears again on the Classic Caballeros Collection DVD. The sequence has since been restored as the unedited version has been much requested. The fully unedited version is available as a bonus feature on the Walt & El Grupo DVD release and fully unedited and restored on Saludos Amigos and The Three Caballeros 75th Anniversary Edition 2-Movie Collection Blu-ray. When the film was released on Disney's streaming platform Disney+, the edited version of the sequence was used despite disclaimers of the film being presented in its original format with "outdated cultural depictions" and tobacco usage, but it has since been changed to the unedited version.

=== Aquarela do Brasil ===
Aquarela do Brasil (Portuguese for "Watercolour of Brazil"), the finale of the film, views Disney artists creating pictures that magically turn into different pictures. One of them is a flower, which turns into Donald Duck after a bee goes into his mouth. When the bee flies out of his mouth, Donald sees a paint brush creating a brand-new character, José Carioca from Rio de Janeiro, Brazil, who shows Donald Duck around South America, lets him have a drink of cachaça with him, which is so spicy for Donald that he starts hiccuping, and introduces him to the samba (complete with the songs "Aquarela do Brasil" and "Tico-Tico no Fubá").

== Cast and characters ==
The voice cast was all uncredited, as was the practice at the time for many animated films.

Trailer of the film, with images of some characters deleted.

- Lee Blair – himself
- Mary Blair – herself
- Pinto Colvig – Goofy
- Walt Disney – himself
- Norman Ferguson – himself
- Frank Graham – himself
- Clarence Nash – Donald Duck
- José do Patrocínio Oliveira – José Carioca (used in the Brazilian Portuguese version)
- Fred Shields – narrator
- Frank Thomas – himself
- Stuart Buchanan – flight attendant

== Music ==
Saludos Amigos

Film score by Edward H. Plumb, Paul J. Smith, and Charles Wolcott
- Released: 1943
- Label: Disneyland Records

The film's original score was composed by Edward H. Plumb, Paul J. Smith, and Charles Wolcott. The title song, "Saludos Amigos", was written for the film by Charles Wolcott and Ned Washington. The film also featured the song "Aquarela do Brasil", written by the popular Brazilian songwriter Ary Barroso and performed by Aloísio de Oliveira, and an instrumental version of "Tico-Tico no Fubá", written by Zequinha de Abreu. "Aquarela do Brasil" was written and first performed in 1939, but did not achieve much initial success. However, after appearing in this film it became an international hit, becoming the first Brazilian song to be played over a million times on American radio.

The film's soundtrack was first released by Decca Records in 1944 as a collection of three 78 rpm singles.

=== Track listing ===
- Side 1: "Saludos Amigos" b/w Side 2: "Inca Suite"
- Side 3: "Brazil ("Aquarela do Brazil")" b/w Side 4: "Argentine Country Dances"
- Side 5: "Tico-Tico" b/w Side 6: "Pedro from Chile"

== Release ==
=== Theatrical ===
Saludos Amigos premiered in Rio de Janeiro on August 24, 1942. It was released in the United States on February 6, 1943. It was theatrically reissued in 1949, when it was shown on a double bill with the first reissue of Dumbo.

The film returned rentals to RKO by 1951 of $1,135,000 with $515,000 being generated in the U.S. and Canada.

=== Home media ===
In 1995, the film was released on Laserdisc under the "Exclusive Archive Collection" series.

It was later released on both VHS and DVD on May 2, 2000, under the Walt Disney Gold Classic Collection banner, and again on DVD on April 29, 2008, under the Classic Caballeros Collection banner. The film received a third DVD release on November 30, 2010, as a bonus Feature on the Walt & El Grupo DVD. A fourth release, the first on Blu-ray, was released on January 30, 2018, as Saludos Amigos and The Three Caballeros 75th Anniversary Edition 2-Movie Collection).

== Reception ==
The film holds an 80% approval rating on Rotten Tomatoes based on 15 reviews, with an average score of 6.40/10, the site's consensus stating, "One of Disney's lesser-known animated films, Saludos Amigos may be slight stuff, but it's still a spirited, energetic travelogue."

== Awards and nominations ==
Award	Category	Nominee(s)	Result	Ref.
Academy Awards	Best Scoring of a Musical Picture	Edward H. Plumb, Paul Smith and Charles Wolcott	Nominated	
Academy Awards	Best Original Song	"Saludos Amigos"; Music by Charles Wolcott; Lyrics by Ned Washington	Nominated	
Academy Awards	Best Sound Recording	C. O. Slyfield	Nominated	
National Board of Review Awards	Best Documentary		Won	

== See also ==
- Walt & El Grupo, a documentary film about the making of Saludos Amigos and The Three Caballeros
- 1942 in film
- List of American films of 1942
- List of Walt Disney Pictures films
- List of Disney theatrical animated features
- List of animated feature films of the 1940s
- List of films with live action and animation
- List of package films
- South of the Border with Disney
