= South of the Border with Disney =

1942 film by Norm Ferguson

- Directed by: Norman Ferguson
- Produced by: Walt Disney
- Starring: Art Baker (narrator)
- Music by: Edward H. Plumb
- Production companies: Walt Disney Productions, under the auspices of the Office of the Coordinator of Inter-American Affairs
- Release date: November 23, 1942
- Running time: 32 minutes
- Country: United States
- Languages: English; Spanish; Brazilian Portuguese

South of the Border with Disney is a 1942 Disney live-action short documentary film. It was shot on the same occasion as the live-action segments of Disney's Saludos Amigos, when Walt Disney and a group of eighteen artists, musicians and writers traveled to South America looking for inspiration for creative projects. Disney's trip was conducted under the auspices of the Office of the Coordinator of Inter-American Affairs (CIAA) in order to promote cooperation between the United States and various South American nations.

While Saludos Amigos includes both animated shorts and live-action sequences, South of the Border with Disney is a behind-the-scenes documentary featuring only travel footage and the inspiration for animated segments of Saludos Amigos, as well as for the feature-length The Three Caballeros and other animated shorts. The film also includes pencil test animation and stock music from Disney's 1942 animated feature film Bambi.

South of the Border with Disney was distributed in 16mm through nontheatrical channels by the CIAA rather than receiving a traditional theatrical release through Disney's distribution partner RKO Radio Pictures. The film was copyrighted by Walt Disney Productions and renewed in 1969. (Note: Under R473852)

== Synopsis ==
The film begins at a temporary studio Disney improvised for his traveling entourage of artists, musicians, and writers at a Rio de Janeiro hotel. The group tours the city, meeting with Brazilian writers and artists, as well as visiting various points-of-interest. In addition to a military parade celebrating Brazil's independence day, the group visits the summit of Corcovado and Sugarloaf Mountain. At the botanical gardens, artists sketch Brazilian flora, including orchids, water lilies, and various trees. At the zoo, artists sketch local wildlife, such as flamingoes, anteaters, tapirs, armadillos, and parrots. The armadillo inspires a character in the 1943 Pluto cartoon, Pluto and the Armadillo. The parrots inspire Jose Carioca, a companion to Donald Duck who debuts in the Aquareia do Brasil segment of Saludos Amigos and appears again in The Three Caballeros.

The group next flies to Montevideo, Uruguay where they observe locals fishing on the harbor's waterfront, enjoying beach resorts, and basking in the mild weather. Traveling to Buenos Aires, Argentina, the group draws inspiration from the city's architecture, street life, and recreational activities like football and polo. The group visits a rural area in the Pampas for a taste of Argentine folk dancing (zamba), as well as an introduction to the gaucho lifestyle (Argentine cowboy). This trip through the Pampas inspired the El Gaucho Goofy segment of Saludos Amigos, as well as The Flying Gauchito segment of The Three Caballeros.

Flying west across the Andes Mountains to Santiago, Chile, artists created sketches of the high peaks, serving as inspiration for Pedro, the anthropomorphic airplane segment of Saludos Amigos. While traveling through Chile, the group takes inspiration from the folk music, dances, and costume of local communities, as well as the huasos (Chilean horsemen). At one stop, locals attempt to teach Walt how to play the guitar and perform some of their traditional dances.

The group next departs Chile for La Paz, Bolivia. where they take inspiration from the vivid colors of the city's marketplace, traditional music, and indigenous costumes. The Lake Titicaca segment of Saludos Amigos is inspired by the group's visit to the lake straddling the Bolivian-Peruvian border.

The group continues through Ecuador, Colombia, Venezuela, and Guatemala, with final stops in Mexico. Much of these latter stops inspired segments of The Three Caballeros. The film ends with Walt and the group returning to Los Angeles where they stop at U.S. Customs for their baggage to be examined. The Customs officer is exhausted with the group's number of sketches and souvenirs, ending with the sight gag of a horse emerging from Walt's luggage.

== Release ==
=== Home media ===
In 2000, South of the Border with Disney was included on the Gold Classic Collection DVD release of Saludos Amigos as a bonus feature. The short was featured again as a bonus feature on the 2008 Saludos Amigos/The Three Caballeros Classic Caballeros Collection two-movie DVD release.

=== Streaming ===
South of the Border with Disney is not available on streaming services currently.

== See also ==
- Saludos Amigos
- The Three Caballeros
- Walt and El Grupo
