= Milagros: An Extraordinary Bear =

- Peruvian theatrical release poster
- Directed by: Eduardo Schuldt
- Screenplay by: Sandro Ventura
- Based on: Milagros: Una osa extraordinaria by Hernán Garrido Lecca
- Produced by: Hernan Garrido Lecca
- Starring: Melany Segura; Nicole Valera; Ann Giraldo; Genaro Vásquez
- Production company: Chaska Entertainment
- Distributed by: A Contracorriente Films (Spain)
- Release date: July 27, 2023
- Running time: 80 minutes
- Country: Peru
- Language: Spanish

Milagros: An Extraordinary Bear (Spanish: Milagros: Una osa extraordinaria) is a 2023 Peruvian animated adventure comedy film directed by Eduardo Schuldt from a screenplay written by Sandro Ventura, based on the book of the same name by Hernán Garrido Lecca. It is about a spectacled bear who has to learn the good and bad of nature and humanity.

== Synopsis ==
Milagros is a spectacled bear who lives in the Peruvian Amazon and has great intelligence, to the point of having the ability to understand human language. Together with some of his friends, he will have the mission of facing the challenges of nature and the tremendous cruelty of man with the aim of preserving his species and saving his ecosystem.

== Voice cast ==
- Melany Segura as Milagros
- Nicole Valera as Yana Yana
- Ann Giraldo as Zorrito
- Genaro Vásquez as Clown
- Liliana Robledo as Mom Raymi / Mom Turtle
- Felipe Valladares as Puma
- Milagros Cruz as Cholita
- Omar Toledo as Hunter 1 / Bar Owner
- Bruno Rugel as Hunter 2
- Karla Puppo as Rescuer 1
- Anthony Rodríguez as Rescuer 2
- Saussure Figueroa as Feller 1
- Andersson Mori as Feller 2
- David Cáceres as Feller 3
- Anderson Ruiz as Male Doctor
- Mariale Cook as Baby Turtle / Female Doctor
- Liam Quino Neff as Frog
- Levi Acosta as Man of the people
- Vincent Vera as Pilot Man
- Martín Mendez as Yana Puka

== Production ==
The production and animation of the film lasted 2 years.

== Release ==
Milagros: An Extraordinary Bear premiered on July 27, 2023, in Peruvian theaters, then was released on August 31, 2023, in Colombian theaters, on June 20, 2024, in Russian theaters, on September 20, 2024, in Spanish theaters by A Contracorriente Films.
