= Pirates in Callao =

- Directed by: Eduardo Schuldt
- Screenplay by: Hernán Garrido Lecca; Pipo Gallo
- Based on: Pirates in Callao by Hernán Garrido Lecca
- Produced by: Hernán Garrido Lecca; Jaime Carbajal; José Antonio Chang; Shirley Svensson
- Starring: Diego Bertie; Stephanie Cayo; Salvador del Solar; Alberto Ísola; Gonzalo Torres
- Edited by: Alan Brain
- Music by: Diego Rivera; TK
- Production company: Alpamayo Entertainment
- Distributed by: United International Pictures (Peru)
- Release dates: 24 February 2005 (Peru); 28 October 2005 (U.S.)
- Running time: 78 minutes
- Country: Peru
- Language: Spanish
- Budget: $500,000 (estimated)

Pirates in Callao (Spanish: Piratas en el Callao) is a 2005 Peruvian CGI science fantasy animated film directed by Eduardo Schuldt based on the children's book of the same name written by Hernán Garrido Lecca. It tells the story of Alberto, a Peruvian kid who gets lost during a school trip to the Real Felipe Fortress in the seaport of Callao. Nine-year-old Alberto falls through a hole and travels back in time to the 17th century, when the port is about to be attacked by a group of Dutch pirates led by Jacques L'Hermite. There, he meets other children who have also traveled back in time, and together they fight and defeat L'Hermite.
