= A Giant Adventure =

- Peruvian theatrical release poster
- Directed by: Eduardo Schuldt
- Screenplay by: Eduardo Schuldt; Sandro Ventura; Roberto Valdivieso; Rosa Dávila; Penelope Vilallonga
- Story by: Eduardo Schuldt; Penelope Vilallonga
- Based on: Nazca by Gilberto Ríos
- Produced by: Carolina Cuadros; Renato Thayz; Jesus Sebastian Barranzuela; Antonio Martín Duffoó; Juan Diego Valverde; Carlos Stevenson
- Edited by: Eduardo Schuldt
- Production company: Alligator Entertainment
- Distributed by: Diamond Films
- Release date: January 12, 2023
- Running time: 80 minutes
- Country: Peru
- Language: Spanish

A Giant Adventure (Spanish: Una aventura gigante) is a 2023 Peruvian animated adventure comedy film co-written, edited and directed by Eduardo Schuldt. It is partially based on the book Nazca by Gilberto Ríos. It features the voices of Gina Yangali, Merly Morello, Gustavo Bueno, Yiddá Eslava, Reynaldo Arenas, Paul Martin, Denisse Dibós and Gustavo Mayer.

== Synopsis ==
Sophia is a young aviator who lost her mother during her childhood when she was flying over the Nazca lines. The sudden appearance of Sebastián in her life leads her to pilot a small plane that serves as a vehicle to a world where the beings of pre-Inca mythology come to life.

== Voice cast ==
The actors participating in this film are:

- Merly Morello as Sophia
- Gina Yangali as Sebastian
- Gustavo Bueno as Guardian Condor
- Yiddá Eslava as Silvia
- Reynaldo Arenas as Guardian Monkey / Supay
- Paul Martin as Guardian Colibri
- Denisse Dibós as Anahi / Guardian Spider
- Gustavo Mayer as Miguel
- Eike Schuldt as Wawa

== Production ==
Production began in 2019 and lasted 4 years, motion capture programs provided by the Xsens system were used to animate the film.

== Release ==
It premiered on January 12, 2023, in Peruvian theaters, then was released on May 13, 2023, in Ecuadorian theaters, on August 25, 2023, in Spanish theaters by A Contracorriente Films, and on August 2, 2024, in Turkish theaters.

== Reception ==
Carlos Oré Arroyo from Infobae highlighted the participation of actors such as Gustavo Bueno and Reynaldo Arenas, but criticized the film's weak script and resolution. Andro Mairata from La República stated: "Schuldt makes A Giant Adventure a pedagogical product, with the clear intention that children appreciate Nazca culture. Motivation is good, but then we have phrases and rhetoric worthy of a classroom, not a movie story."
