= The Illusionauts =

- Release poster
- Directed by: Eduardo Schuldt
- Written by: Abraham Vurnbrand
- Produced by: Mitch Budin; Richard Goldberg; Norman J. Grossfeld; Lise Romanoff; Hugo Rose; Abraham Vurnbrand
- Edited by: Alvaro Iparraguirre
- Production companies: Aronnax Animation Studios; Televix Entertainment
- Distributed by: Andes Films (Peru); Vertical Entertainment (United States)
- Release date: January 26, 2012
- Running time: 82 minutes
- Country: Peru
- Language: Spanish
- Budget: $3 million
- Box office: $888 041

The Illusionauts (Spanish: Los ilusionautas; released in Spain as La patrulla increíble, lit. 'The Incredible Patrol'; also known in English as Freedom Force or Fantastic Force (stylized as either 4antastic Force or Fantastic 4orce) in the United Kingdom) is a 2012 Peruvian animated science fiction adventure comedy film directed by Eduardo Schuldt and written by Abraham Vurnbrand. It features the voices of Giovanni Ciccia, Connie Chaparro, and Bruno Ascenzo in its original version, and in the English dubbing are Sarah Michelle Gellar and Christopher Lloyd, among others. The film, announced in early 2010 as The Verne Project, was the first film released under Aronnax Animation Studios, a joint venture with Televix Entertainment. It premiered on January 26, 2012, in Peruvian theaters.

== Synopsis ==
A group of children with special powers and their faithful dog are sent on a journey through time; their goal is to restore famous stories, while the crazy president and the Minister of Cultural Affairs try to alter them. They have to deal with a lot of difficulties to do their job well and not mix anything up.

== Cast ==
- Giovanni Ciccia as Albino
- Connie Chaparro as First Lady of France
- Bruno Ascenzo as Aristóteles
- Sarah Michelle Gellar as Nicole DuBois (English dub)
- Christopher Lloyd as The Professor (English dub)

== Reception ==
The Illusionauts sold 214,679 theater tickets ($740,000), becoming the most successful Peruvian film of 2012.
