= Jacques l'Hermite =

Flemish merchant, explorer and admiral

- Born: Jacques de Clerk c. 1582; Antwerp, Dutch Republic
- Died: 2 June 1624; Callao, Viceroyalty of Peru
- Cause of death: Dysentery, Scurvy
- Resting place: San Lorenzo Island
- Other names: Jacques l'Heremite
- Occupations: Merchant, Admiral, Explorer
- Spouse: Theodora van Wely

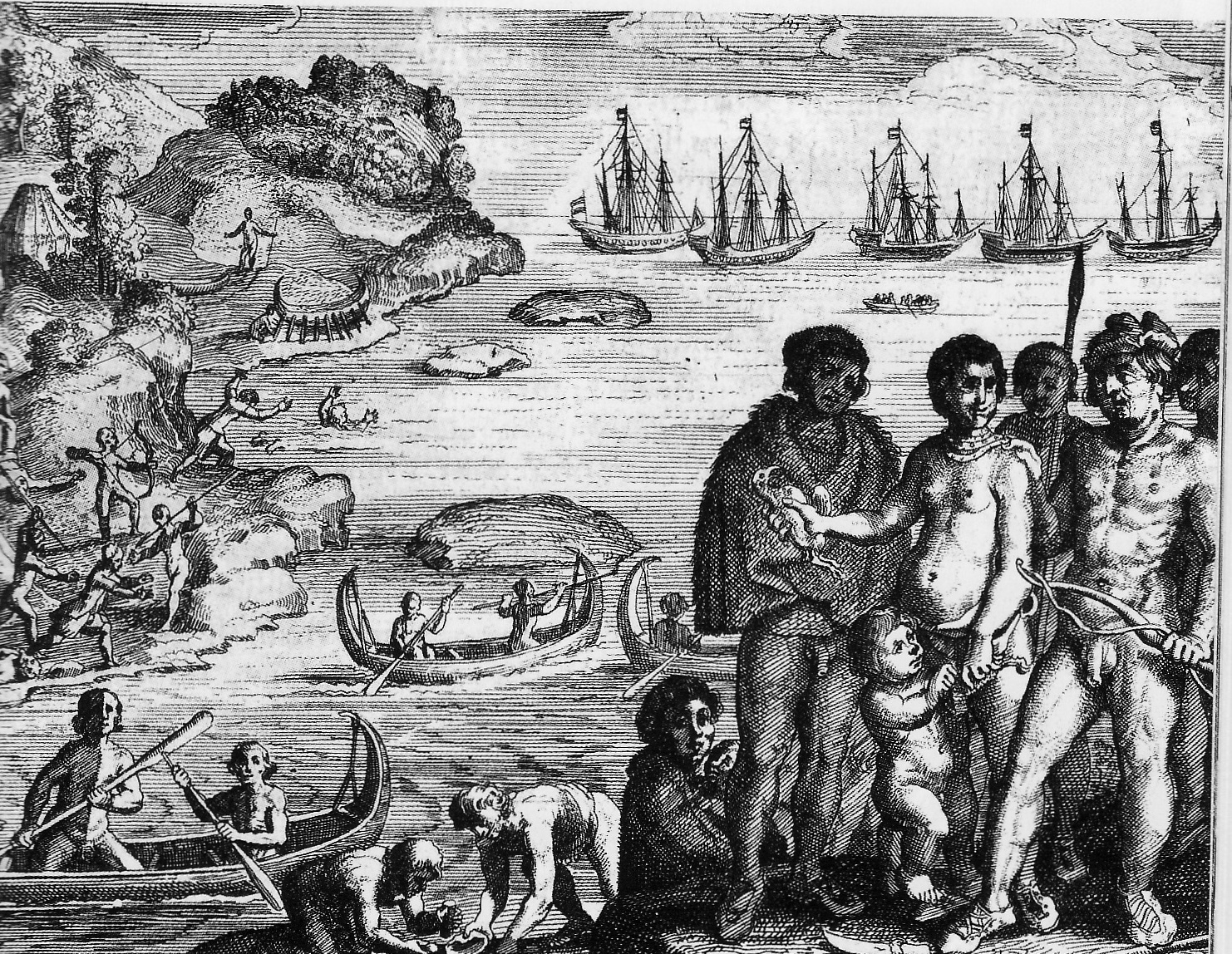
Encounter with Yamana American Indians

Jacques l'Hermite (c. 1582 – 2 June 1624), sometimes also known as Jacques le Clerq, was a Flemish merchant, explorer and admiral known for his journey around the globe with the Nassau Fleet (1623–1626) and for his blockade and raid on Callao in 1624 during that same voyage in which he also died. He served the Dutch East India Company as chief merchant in Bantam and Ambon Island in the Dutch East Indies. The Chilean Hermite Islands near Cape Horn which his fleet charted in February 1624 are named after him.

== Personal life ==
L'Hermite was born in Antwerp, Duchy of Brabant (present-day Belgium) around the year 1582. After the fall of Antwerp in 1585 in a battle with the Spanish Empire, the family moved north to Amsterdam and later settled in Rotterdam. He left the republic in 1606 and spent the next six years working in the Dutch East Indies.

== Professional life ==
In 1606, l'Hermite set sail to the Dutch East Indies as a secretary on the fleet commanded by Admiral Cornelis Matelief Jr. where in 1607 he was appointed chief merchant on Black Lion (Swarte Leeuw). From 1607 to 1611, l'Hermite was chief merchant (opperkoopman) for the Dutch East India Company in Bantam, Dutch East Indies. After six years working abroad he returned to Amsterdam in the Dutch Republic. There he married Theodora van Wely in March 1613.

In April 1623, l'Hermite was commissioned by Prince Maurice of Nassau and the Dutch State General to lead a fleet of eleven ships known as the Nassau Fleet (Nassausche vloot) with its flagship Amsterdam. The fleet set sail on a circumnavigational voyage westwards from Amsterdam to the western coast of South America with the objective to hunt down Spanish silver ships leaving Peru and to establish a Dutch colony in either Peru or Chile, at that time known as the Viceroyalty of Peru.

Although commanded by Admiral l'Hermite, the fleet was de facto led by his Vice-Admiral Gheen Huygen Schapenham and Rear-Admiral Julius Wilhelm Van Verschoor after l'Hermite like most of its crew suffered from dysentery during the journey. In early 1624, the fleet passed Cape Horn through Lemaire Channel and explored and charted the Hermite Islands. In May 1624, the fleet blocked the port of Callao and raided the cities of Pisco and Guayaquil, but they were unsuccessful in establishing a colony and the fleet was forced to continue its voyage westwards towards the Dutch East Indies.

== Death ==
L'Hermite died on 2 June 1624, during the blockade of Callao, after suffering from dysentery and scurvy for months. He was buried on San Lorenzo Island off the coast of Callao, Peru.

== See also ==
- Pirates in Callao

== Sources ==
- Brederode, Willem van; Doedens, A.; Looijesteijn, H. (2008). Op jacht naar Spaans zilver, het scheepsjournaal van Willem van Brederode [The hunt for Spanish silver] (in Dutch). Uitgeverij Verloren. ISBN 978-90-8704-047-5.
- Gerhard, Peter (2003). Pirates of New Spain 1575–1742. Courier Dover Publications. ISBN 0-486-42611-4.
- l'Heremite, Iaques; Walbeeck, Joannes van; Decker, Adolf (1626). Iournael Vande Nassausche Vloot: Ofte Beschryvingh vande Voyagie om den gantschen Aerdt-kloot, ghedaen met elf Schepen: Onder't beleyd vanden Admirael Iaques l'Heremite, ende Vice-Admirael Geen Huygen Schapenham, inde Iaeren 1623, 1624, 1625, en 1626 (in Dutch). Amsterdam: Hessel Gerritsz. OCLC 1157162200. OL 27259000M. Wikidata Q134120249.
- Lane, Kris E. (1998). Pillaging the empire, piracy in the Americas 1500–1750. M. E. Sharpe. ISBN 0-7656-0257-1.
