= Fort Amsterdam (Curaçao) =

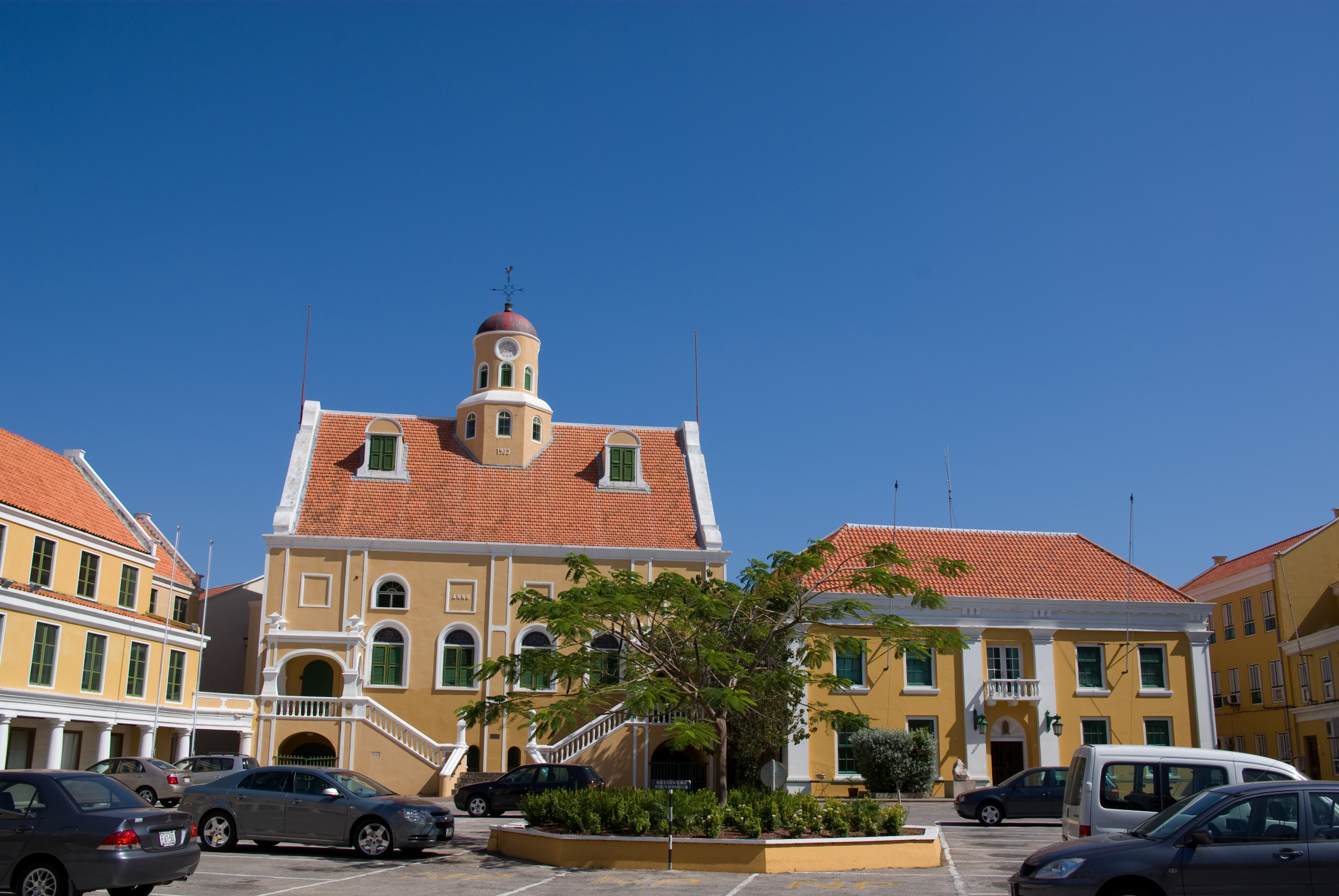
- Fort Amsterdam and the United Protestant Church of Willemstad
- Interactive map of the Fort Amsterdam area

General information
- Location: Willemstad, Curaçao
- Coordinates: 12.1047°N 68.9345°W
- Current tenants: Government of Curaçao; Dutch Reformed Church
- Construction started: 1634
- Inaugurated: 1636
- Client: Dutch West India Company
- Owner: Government of Curaçao

Fort Amsterdam is a fort situated in Willemstad, Curaçao. It was constructed in 1634 by the Dutch West India Company (WIC) and served not only as a military fort but also as the headquarters of the WIC. Currently it serves as the seat of the government and governor of Curaçao. The fort is named after the Amsterdam chamber of the WIC and was considered the main of eight forts on the island.

== History ==
=== Construction, design and use ===
In the 1630s, the Dutch West India Company was searching for a new outpost in the Caribbean. The company set its sight on Curaçao, which was then a Spanish possession. In 1634, the Dutch admiral Johannes van Walbeeck, together with 200 soldiers, landed on the island and fought the 32 Spanish troops, who surrendered on 21 August 1634, after resisting for three weeks.

Van Walbeeck ordered the construction of a fort at the mouth of the Sint Anna Bay. Dutch soldiers and slaves from Angola built the fort, which became the headquarters of the WIC from the outset. Conditions in the fort were poor however, due to a lack of drinking water and food. Soldiers almost started a mutiny that a raise in pay and improved rations quelled. In 1635 or 1636 the construction of the fort was completed. Most of the population then went to live in the fort, with the city of Willemstad eventually growing outside of it.

The fort was designed with three meter wide walls and five bastions, however only four were built. The fort had cannons that were located primarily to seaward.

In 1804, the British naval captain named John Bligh, of HMS Theseus, fired a cannonball at the church. Bligh led a small squadron that captured the fort in February 1804. The ball is still embedded in the southwestern wall of the fort church.

=== Raid ===
On 8 June 1929 the Venezuelan rebel Rafael Simón Urbina, with 250 soldiers, captured the fort. The Venezuelans plundered weapons, ammunition, and the island's treasury. They also managed to capture the Governor of the island, Leonard Albert Fruytier, and hauled him off to Venezuela on the stolen American ship Maracaibo. Following the raid the Dutch government decided to permanently station marines and ships on the island.

== Current use ==
The fort is currently part of the UNESCO World Heritage Site Historic Area of Willemstad, Inner City and Harbour, Curaçao. The offices of the cabinet and governor of Curaçao are located in the fort. There are also some government offices and a museum of the Protestant community located in the Fort Church.

Gallery

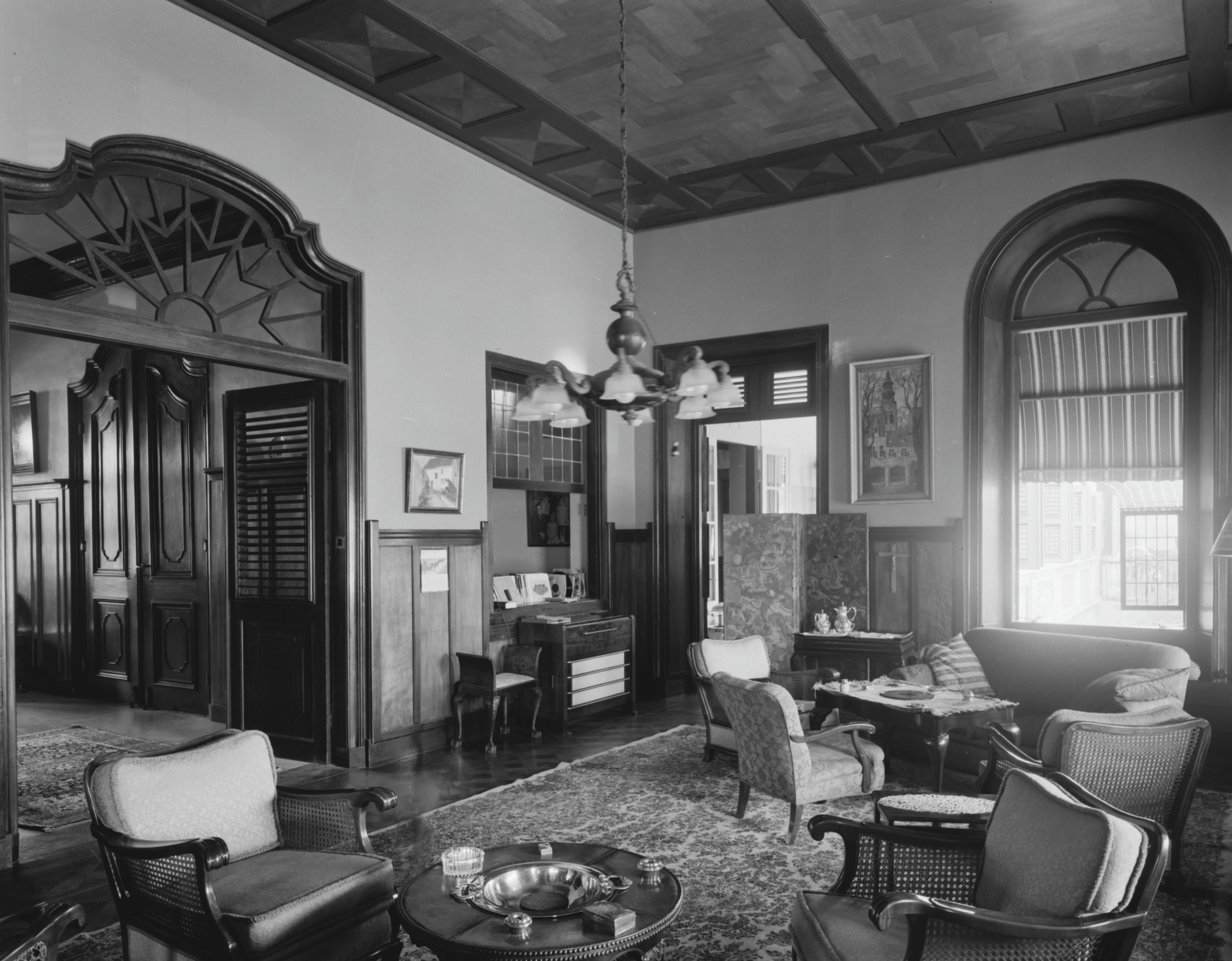
Interior of the governor's apartments, 1954, Dutch Cultural Heritage Agency

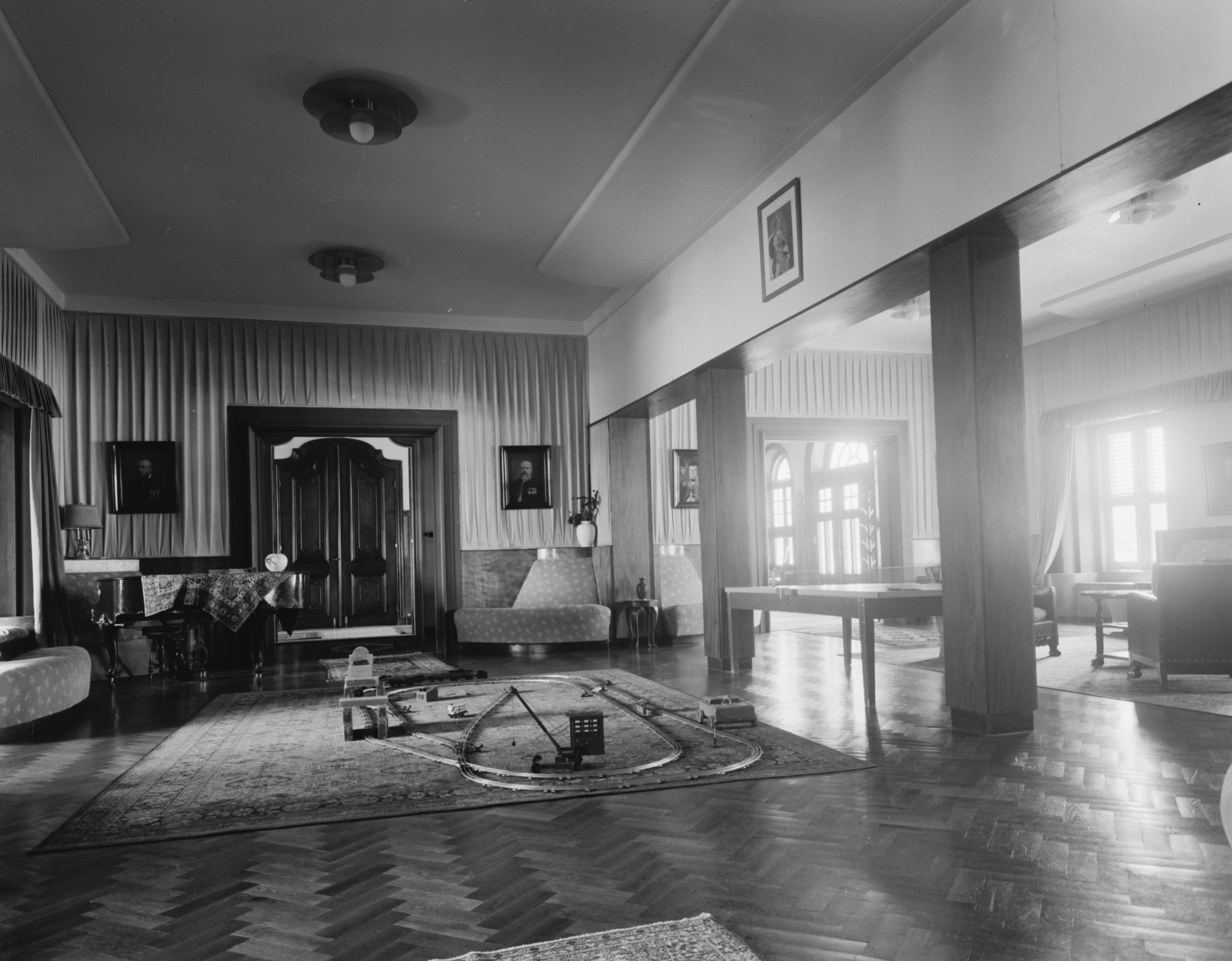
Interior of the governor's apartments,1954, Dutch Cultural Heritage Agency

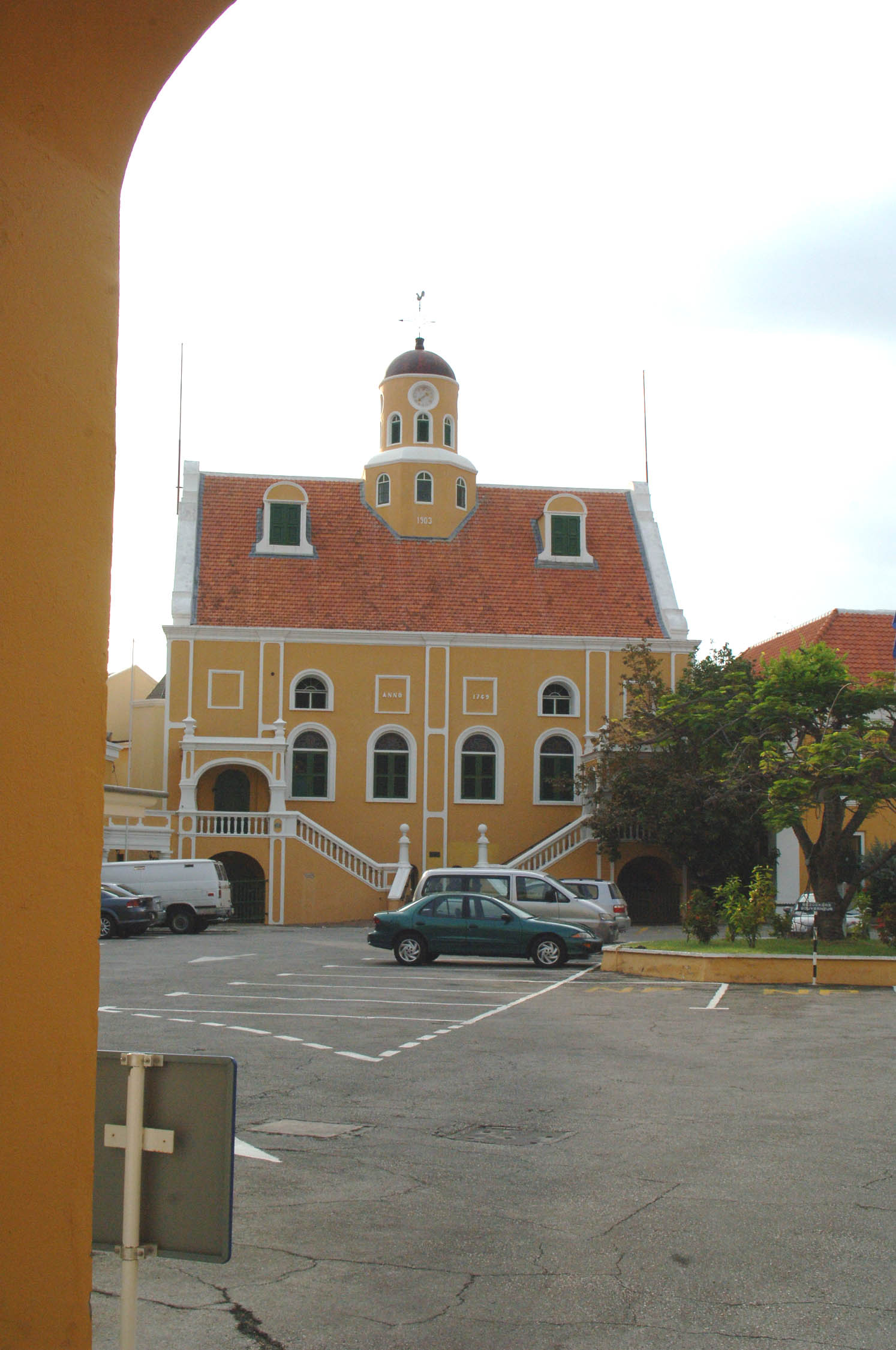
The fort church.

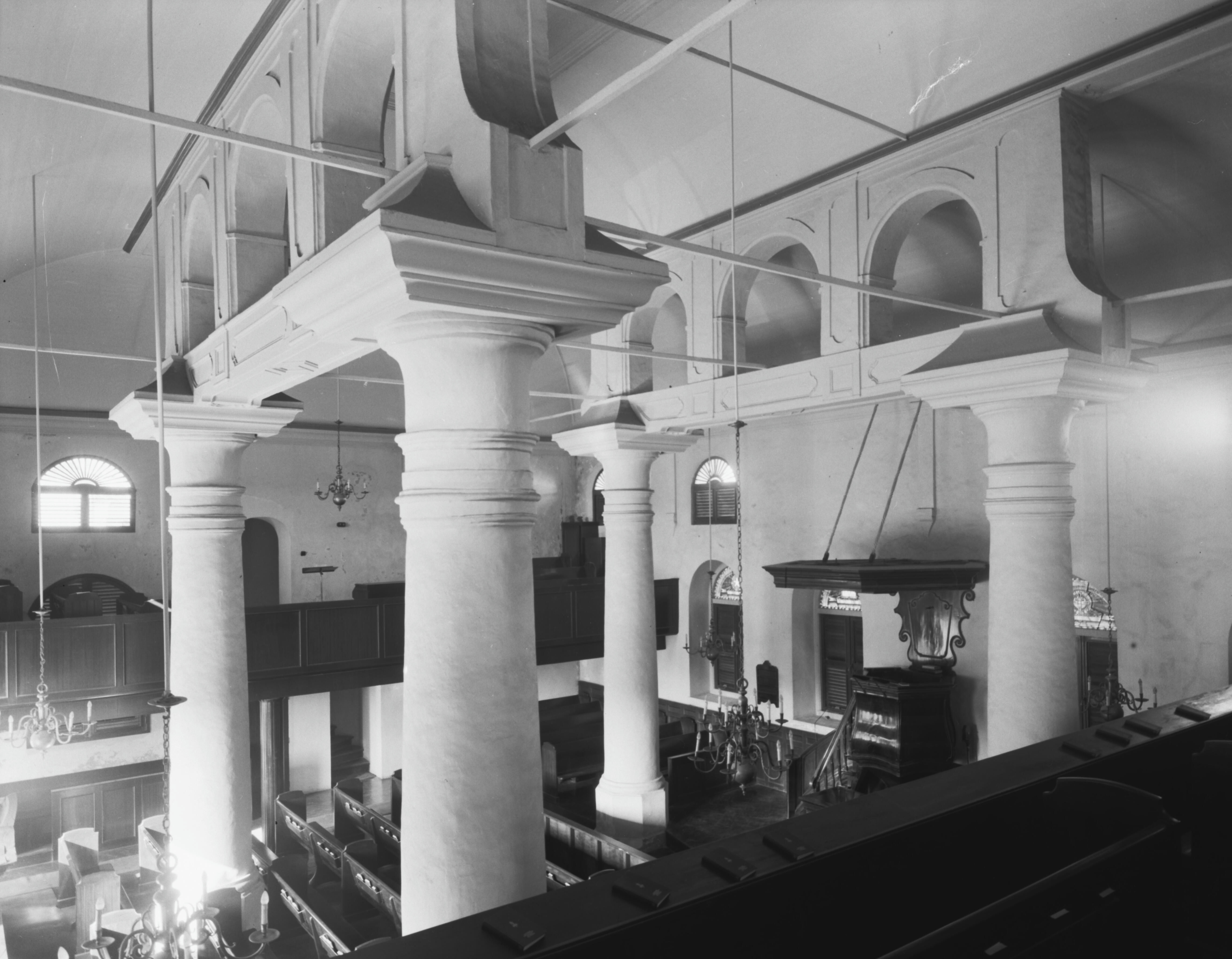
Interior of the fort church in 1954. Dutch Cultural Heritage Agency
