= Dragones: destino de fuego =

Dragones: destino de fuego (Original title); Dragons: Destiny of Fire (English title)
- Directed by: Eduardo Schuldt
- Written by: Giovanna Pollarolo; Enrique Moncloa
- Produced by: Ana María Roca-Rey
- Starring: Gianmarco Zignago; Gianella Neyra; Silvia Navarro; Jésus Ochoa; Ricardo Velasquez
- Edited by: Alan Brain
- Music by: Antonio Gervasoni
- Production company: Alpamayo Entertainment
- Distributed by: Alpamayo Entertainment
- Release dates: July 27, 2006 (Peru); August 11, 2006 (Mexico); March 4, 2007 (Australia); April 8, 2008 (North America)
- Running time: 86 minutes
- Country: Peru
- Language: Spanish
- Budget: $500,000 (estimated)

Dragones: destino de fuego (known in English as Dragons: Destiny of Fire) is a 2006 Peruvian animated film produced by Ana María Roca-Rey and animated and distributed by Alpamayo Entertainment.

== Plot ==
A tiny purple dragon named John John (originally named Sinchi), who was originally raised by an affectionate family of close-knit condors, who was always assumed that he was just a bit different looking from his feathered siblings. Eventually, the time comes for John John to strike out on his own and seek the answers to his many questions as he embarks on an adventure to discover his true identity, of his real origin. Of course, the world is a rather large place for such a little dragon, but he's not alone. He has the help of some new friends John John makes, as he can finally discover the secret to making the world a better place to live, for every living creature.

== Voice cast ==
Character	Original Spanish voices	English Dubbing-voices
John John/Sinchi	Gianmarco Zignago	---
Lily	Gianella Neyra	---
Marina	Silvia Navarro	---
Vildrok	Jésus Ochoa	---
King John	Roberto Moll	---
Wintata	Ricardo Velásquez	---
Illa Pu	Paul Martin	---
Wara	Katia Condos	---
Ari	Bruno Ascenzo	---
Sillu	Romulo Assereto	---
Chulla Chaqui	Elva Alcandré	---
Condoreza	Saskia Bernaola	---
Grodok	Javier Echevarría	---

== Reception ==
Reception was mixed. "The prevailing shallowness and conformism only restrict the few efforts to capture the attention of even the youngest viewers for a moment (...) The incredibly boring and unbearable film revolving around John John (how detestable even the name is!) and his friends only remains in our memory if we have to tally up the few Peruvian films released so far this year. It's an uncomfortable presence, given the absolute stagnation of these animation pioneers in the country, who have failed to learn from past mistakes.", wrote a Peruvian review while Correo stated: "The landscapes they travel through allow them to see the beauty of the Peruvian highlands and jungle, the mountains, the rivers and of course, Lake Titicaca, the protagonist's childhood home."
