= Johannes van Walbeeck =

Dutch navigator and cartographer

Jan, Johan or Johannes van Walbeeck (1602 in Amsterdam – after 1649) was a Dutch navigator and cartographer during a 1620s circumnavigation of the earth, an admiral of the Dutch West India Company, and the first governor of the Netherlands Antilles.

== Early life ==
Van Walbeeck is thought to have been born in Amsterdam in 1601 or 1602 and he might be the Jan van Walbeeck, son of the merchant Jacob van Walbeeck and of Weijntgen van Foreest, who were apparently the only Walbeeck family in town, and was baptized on 15 August 1602 in Amsterdam.

He studied at the University of Leiden before enlisting as navigator and cartographer on the ship De Amsterdam during the three-year circumnavigation of the world from 1623 to 1626 by the Nassau fleet (Nassause vloot) led by Admiral Jacques l'Hermite and Vice Admiral Gheen Huygensz Schapenham. It is thought that the account of this voyage published by Hessel Gerritsz shortly after the expedition's return in 1626 was written and drawn by Van Walbeeck.

In 1627, Van Walbeeck continued his mathematics and physics study in Leiden, but interrupted it again to join Laurens Reael's diplomatic mission to Denmark at the end of the year. Upon his return, he enlisted in a fleet that sailed to the Dutch East Indies.

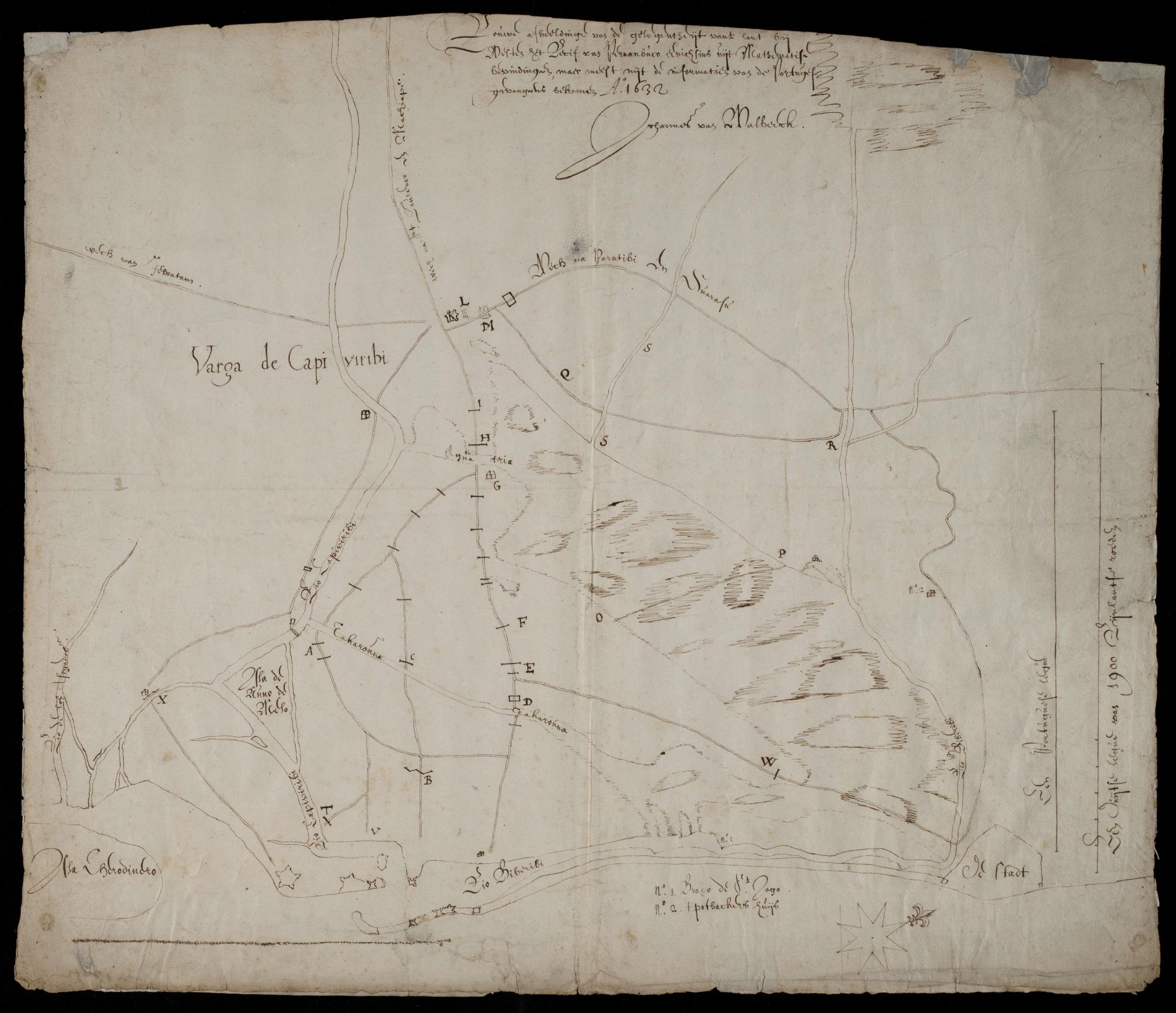
Map of Recife made by Van Walbeeck

== Dutch West India Company ==
After returning to the Netherlands in 1629, van Walbeeck changed employment from the Dutch East India Company to the Dutch West India Company (WIC).

In April 1630, he arrived in Pernambuco aboard the ship Neptunus, shortly after Dutch forces had captured Olinda and Recife from the Portuguese. At the time, these territories were under Spanish rule during the Iberian Union, when Spain and Portugal were governed by the same monarch.

Van Walbeeck was soon appointed a member of the Politieke Raad ("Political Council"), the highest level of government in Dutch Brazil. In the same year, he and Maarten Valck were sent to establish a Dutch base on the Chilean coast from which to explore Terra Australis. Van Walbeeck served as "Admiral of the Brazilian coast". However, due to the colonial conflicts between the Dutch Republic and Portugal, the expedition did not reach its destination.

Several more expeditions followed, until in 1632 Van Walbeeck was promoted to president of the Politieke Raad.

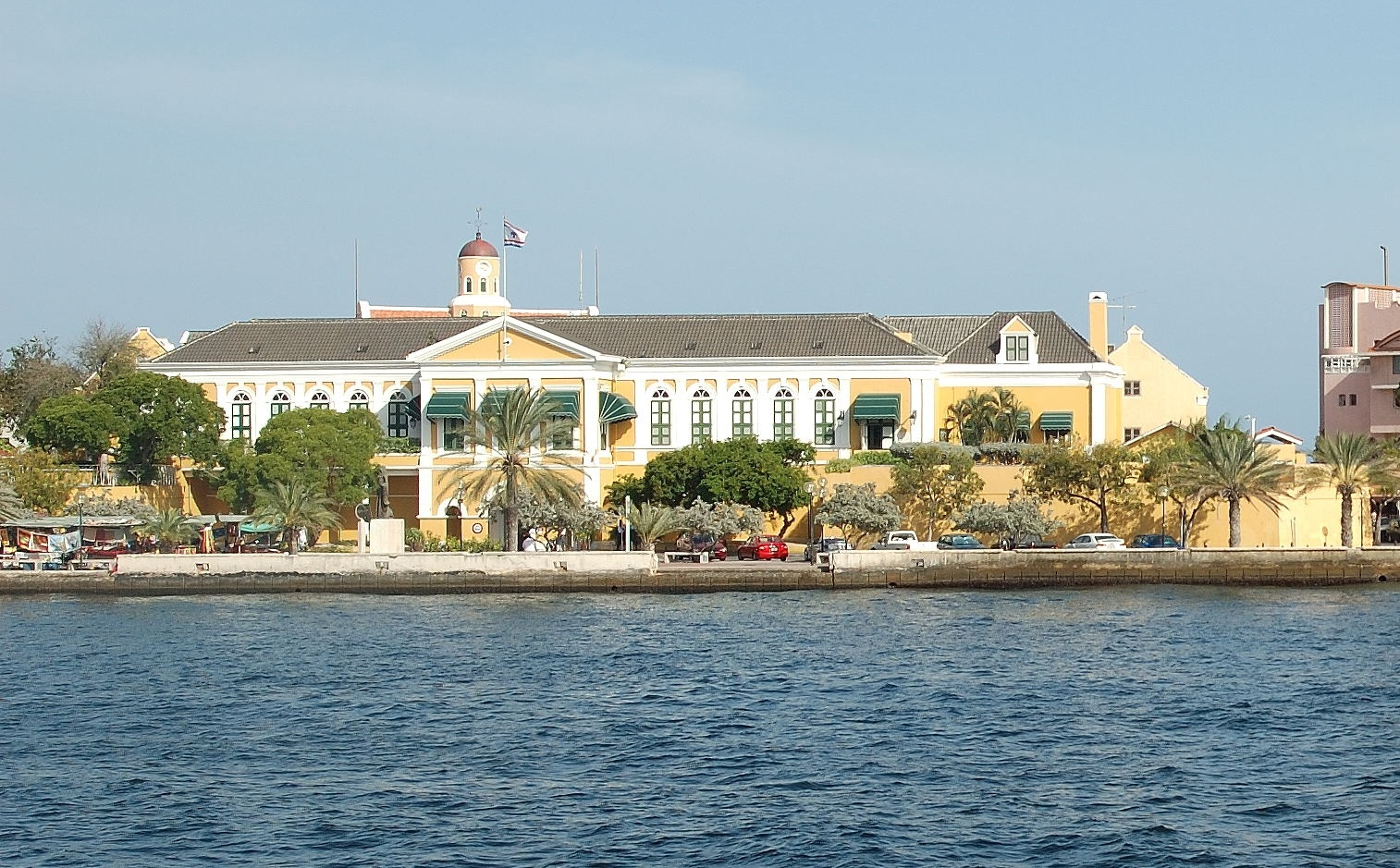
Fort Amsterdam

In 1633, Van Walbeeck and the governor of Dutch Brazil, Dierick van Waerdenburgh, left for the Dutch Republic to meet with the WIC council ("de heren XIX"). The WIC had lost its base in the Antilles when a Spanish fleet had destroyed its settlement on Sint Maarten in the summer of that year.

The council now planned a base in Curaçao and Bonaire, Lesser Antilles under Spanish rule of Province of Venezuela, both for the salt pans (large quantities of salt were needed to preserve fish), and as a strategic location off the South American mainland. The natural harbor of St Anna Bay on Curaçao was the perfect location for this.

== Governor of the Netherlands Antilles ==
On 6 April 1634 Van Walbeeck was assigned with the task of taking St Anna Bay on Curaçao from the Spanish, who had colonized the island since the 1520s.

On 4 May 1634, he departed from Holland with four ships, carrying 180 sailors and 250 soldiers, led by the French Huguenot mercenary Pierre Le Grand who had previously served the Dutch in Brazil. The small fleet arrived at Curaçao on 6 July, but through adverse currents and winds could not enter the bay.

On 29 July, after being joined by a fifth ship and approaching from the north west, the fleet could enter the bay and captured the island from Spain with little resistance and without loss of life on either side. Van Walbeeck wrote in his diary, as transcribed by Johannes de Laet before it was lost, that the 32 Spanish and under 500 remaining (or reintroduced) local Arawaks inhabitants just withdrew to the West end of the island after poisoning their wells and burning their villages.

On 21 August the Spanish commander, Lope Lopez de Morla, signed the surrender. The Dutch deported the Spaniards and most West Indians to the Venezuelan port of Coro, keeping about seventy-five of the latter as laborers. Thus, Van Walbeeck became the first director/governor of the Netherlands Antilles.

The first task was to build a fortification at the natural harbor, renamed "Schottegat" by the Dutch, which pentagonal structure Fort Amsterdam was finished in 1635, following standard Dutch military engineering practice. During his three years as governor, the beginnings of the town of Willemstad were built next to the fort.

In 1638, he and Le Grand were sent to Brazil, while Jacob Pietersz Tolck took over his position as governor although Van Walbeeck remained political director of Curaçao for the next several years. He stayed in Brazil as a member of the Hoge Raad until 1642, after which he returned to Holland again to give advice on the forthcoming expedition under Hendrick Brouwer to establish a trading base in Chile. He went back to Brazil, being mentioned as elder of the Reformed Church there. In 1647 he left Brazil and maybe died in the Netherlands, as he lived in Amsterdam when his wife was buried there on 29 April 1649.

Like Peter Stuyvesant, Van Walbeeck was one of the limited number of WIC employees with a university education. The company appears to have valued him at least as highly as Stuyvesant and it has been suggested that he missed being appointed director-general of the New Netherlands merely by not being in the Netherlands at the right time.

== Bibliography ==
- Johannes van Walbeeck (attributed), Journael vande Nassausche vloot, ofte Beschryvingh vande voyagie om den gantschen aerdt-kloot, gedaen met elf Schepen, onder `t Beleydt van den Admirael Iaques L`Heremite, ende Vice-Admirael Gheen Huygen Schapenham, in de Jaren 1623, 1624, 1625 en 1626, Amsterdam 1626
