= The Entity (2015 film) =

2015 Peruvian supernatural horror film by Eduardo Schuld

- United States poster
- La Entidad
- Directed by: Eduardo Schuldt
- Screenplay by: Sandro Ventura
- Story by: Eduardo Schuldt
- Produced by: Aman Kumar Kapur; Eduardo Schuldt
- Starring: Rodrigo Falla; Daniella Mendoza; Carlos Casella
- Edited by: Alvaro Iparraguirre
- Production company: Star Films
- Distributed by: Star Films (Peru); Film Movement (USA); Njutafilms (Sweden); Solo Media (UK)
- Release date: 22 January 2015 (Peru)
- Running time: 80 minutes
- Country: Peru
- Language: Spanish

The Entity (Spanish: La Entidad) is a 2015 Peruvian 3D supernatural horror film directed by Eduardo Schuldt from a screenplay written by Sandro Ventura. It premiered on 22 January 2015 in Peruvian theaters, and had its film festival debut on 28 August 2015 at Film4 FrightFest. The Entity has been billed as Peru's first 3D horror film and to have been loosely based on true stories.

== Synopsis ==
Needing a good final project for college, a group of media students have chosen to film a documentary researching reaction videos. They're surprised when they find a video featuring someone they know, especially when they discover that anyone who has watched the original video (not the reaction video) has died after they finish watching. Intrigued, the students focus their research, which requires that they visit the deep web, and they find that the original video is tied to an ancient and deadly curse.

== Cast ==
- Rodrigo Falla as Joshua
- Daniella Mendoza as Carla
- Carlos Casella as Lucas
- Mario Gaviria as Benjamín
- Analú Polanco as Isabel

== Reception ==
Prior to its release The Entity received comparisons to similarly themed films such as Paranormal Activity, The Blair Witch Project, and Ring. Review websites Flickering Myth and Nerdly commented upon these comparisons, as both felt that The Entity suffered from being too overly familiar to pre-existing works. Twitch Film was more positive, writing "Seasoned horror fans will find nothing new here, being able to guess most of the plot beats; but then again, Peruvian directors are just starting to try their hand at a genre which has been around for a long while. As more of them attempt to scare audiences, they'll hopefully improve on what came before. With its effective creepy atmosphere and solid use of an often-maligned gimmick, La Entidad is a good step in the right direction."
