= Fort Church, Curaçao =

Fort Church
- Fortkerk
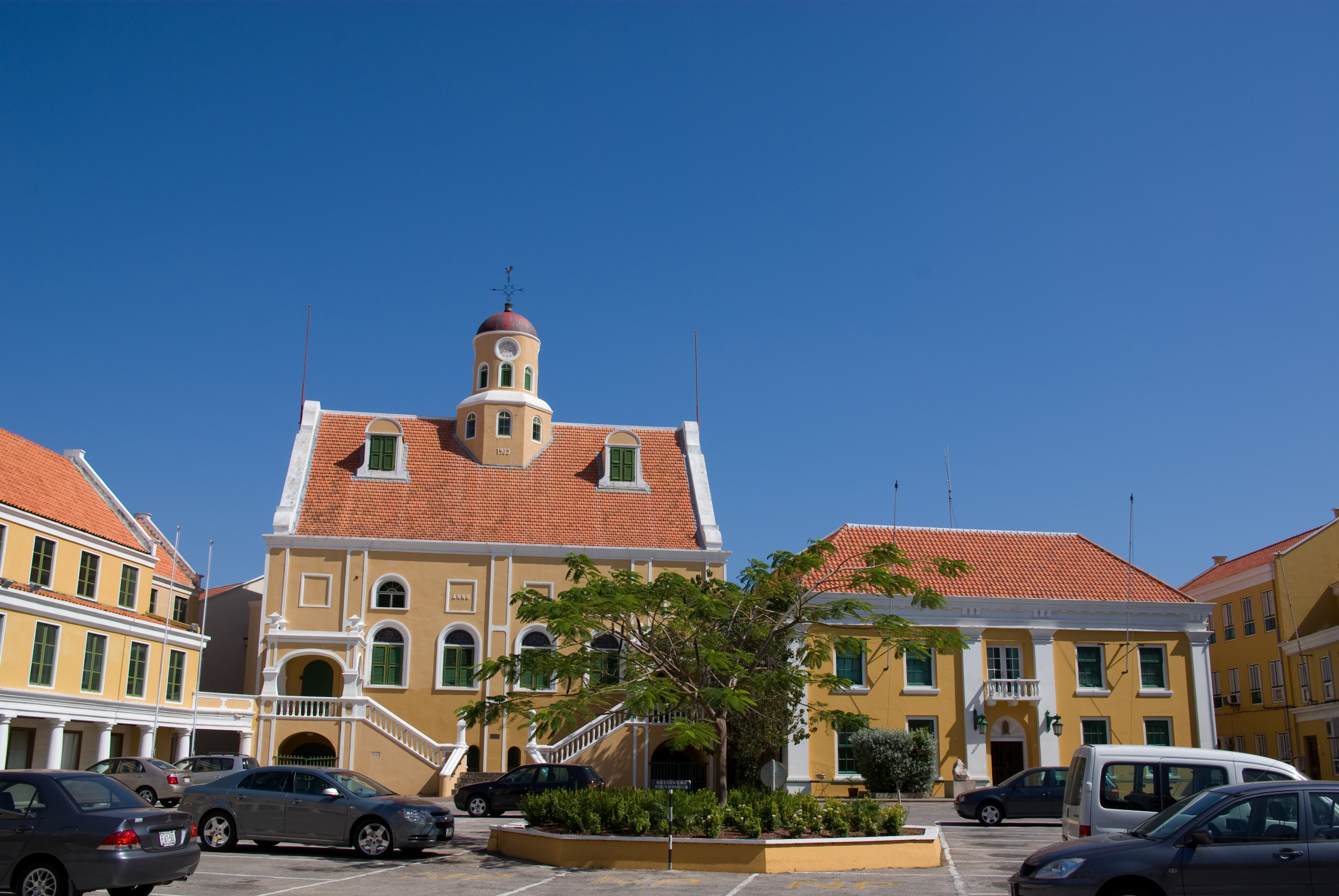

- Location within Curaçao
- 12°6′16.06″N 68°56′3.98″W
- Location: Willemstad; Curaçao
- Country: Netherlands
- Denomination: Protestant Church

Architecture
- Years built: 1766-1769

Specifications
- Height: 16 metres (52 ft)

The Fort Church (Dutch: Fortkerk) is a church of the United Protestant Community located in the court of Fort Amsterdam in Willemstad, Curaçao. The church dates from 1769, and is still in use. A museum is located in the basement. The Fort Church is listed as a UNESCO World Heritage Site.

== History ==
In 1635, after the conquest of Curaçao by the Dutch West India Company, construction started of Fort Amsterdam. The next year, a wooden Dutch Reformed church was constructed. In 1766, the present church was built to serve the garrison, and was consecrated im 1769.

In 1804, Curaçao was conquered by Great Britain, and a cannonball is located in the outerwall of the church. The church of the Lutheran community, the other protestant denomination, burnt down during the conquest. It was decided that the Reformed and Lutherans would share the Fort Church. In 1824, the Lutheran Church and Dutch Reformed Church merged into the United Protestant Community of Curaçao.

The octagonal church tower was replaced by a round tower in 1903. The church was restored in 1991. In 1995, it was awarded monument status. In 1997, the historical centre of Willemstad including the Fort Church was listed as a UNESCO World Heritage Site.

The Fort Church is the most important church of the community, and offers services in Dutch every Sunday morning. The mahogany pulpit and governor's bench date from 1769 and were designed by Pieter de Mey.

== Fort Church Museum ==
A museum is located in the basement of the Fort Church, and contains an overview of the Protestant history of Curaçao. The museum contains the original clockwork of 1766 which was built by Dirk van der Meer, and is considered a masterpiece.

== Gallery ==
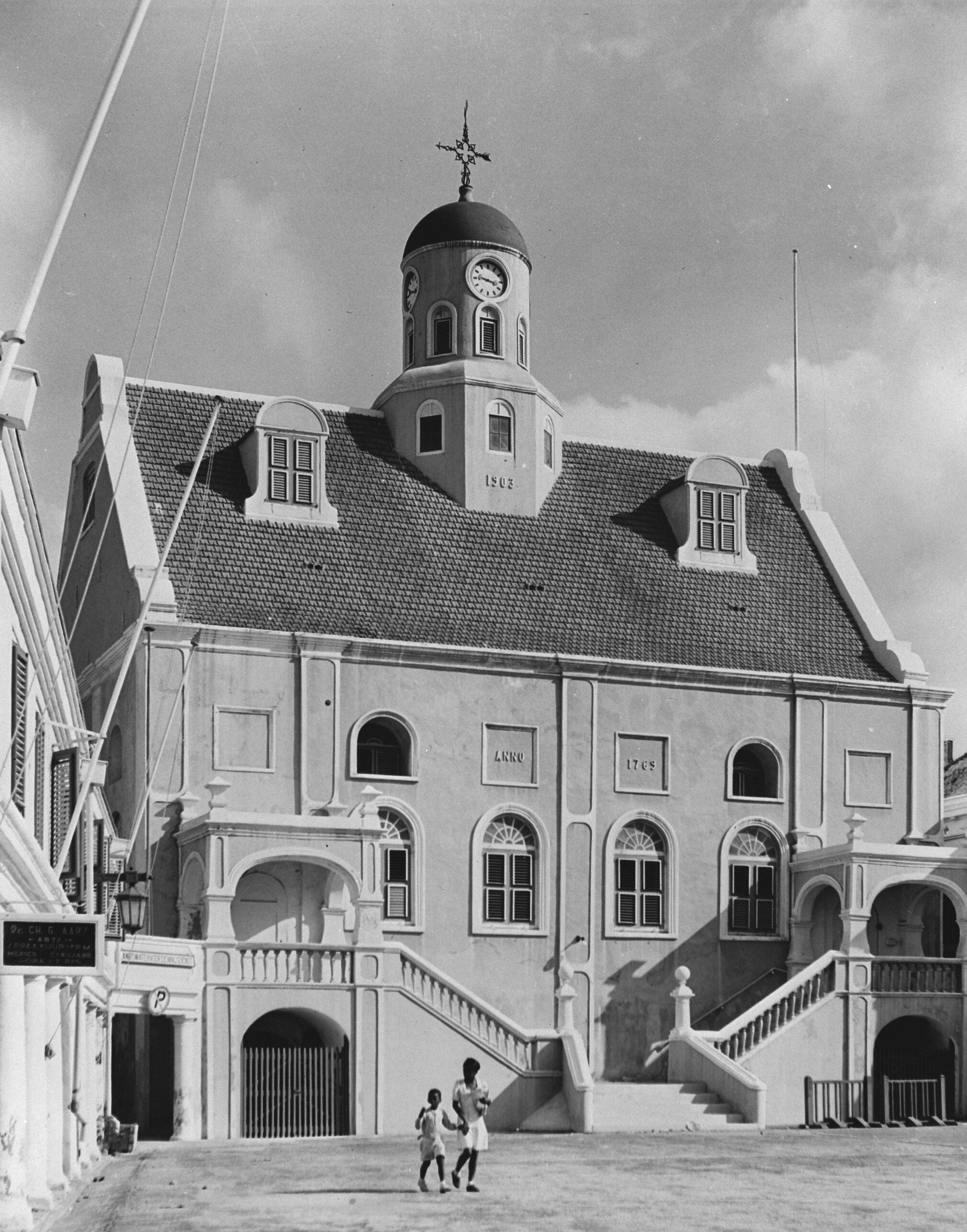
Fort Church (1940-1945)

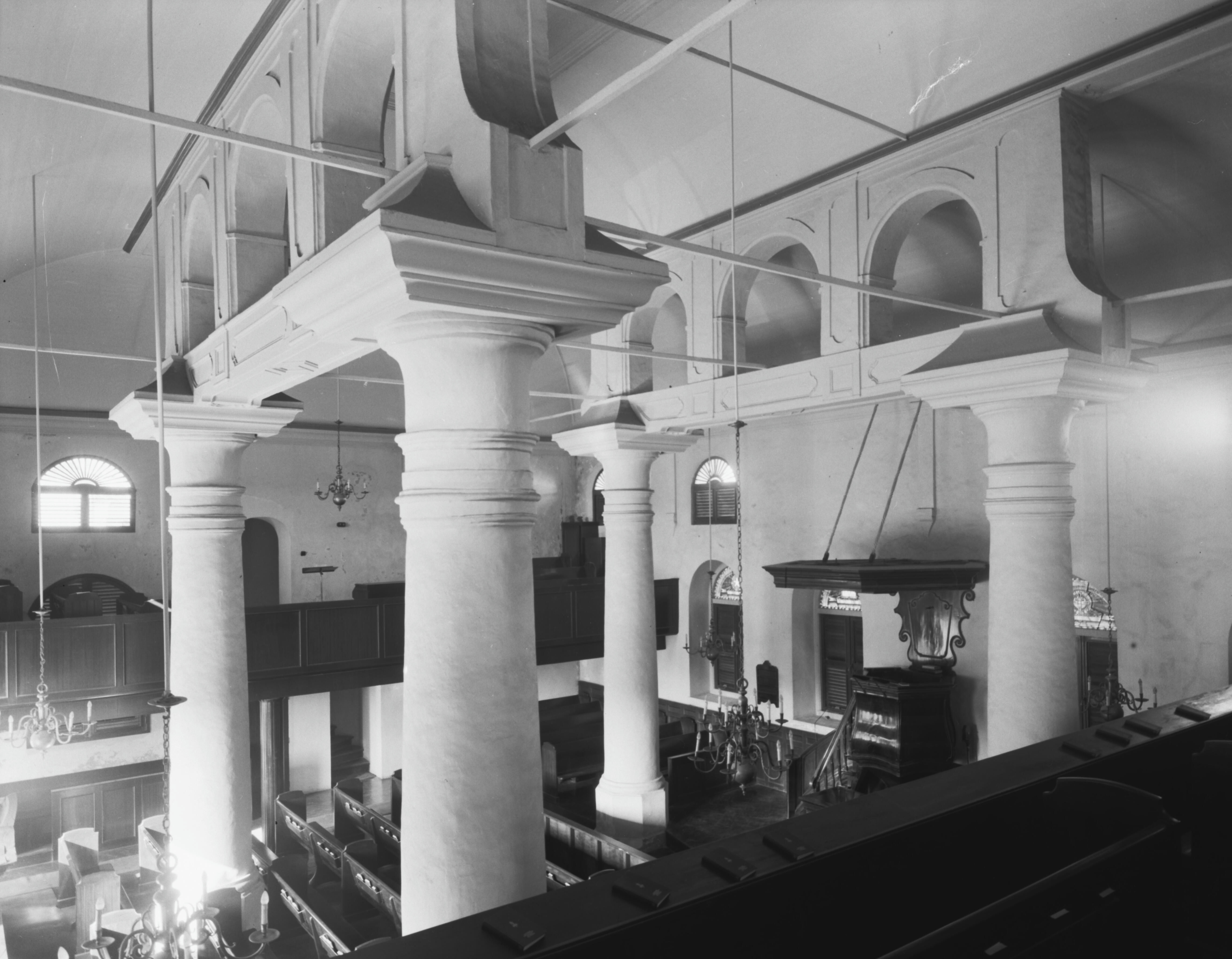
West gallery (1954)

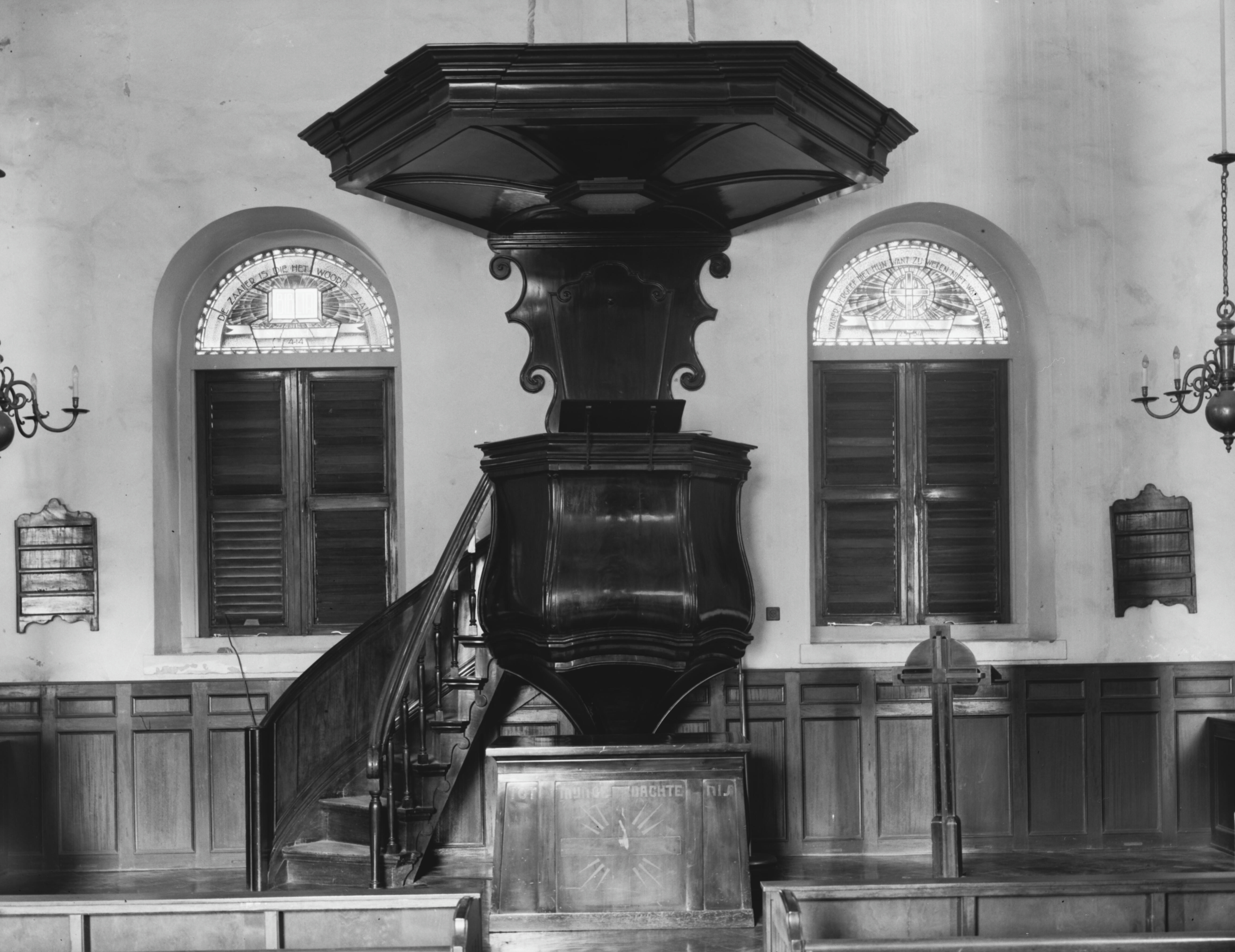
Pulpit (1954)

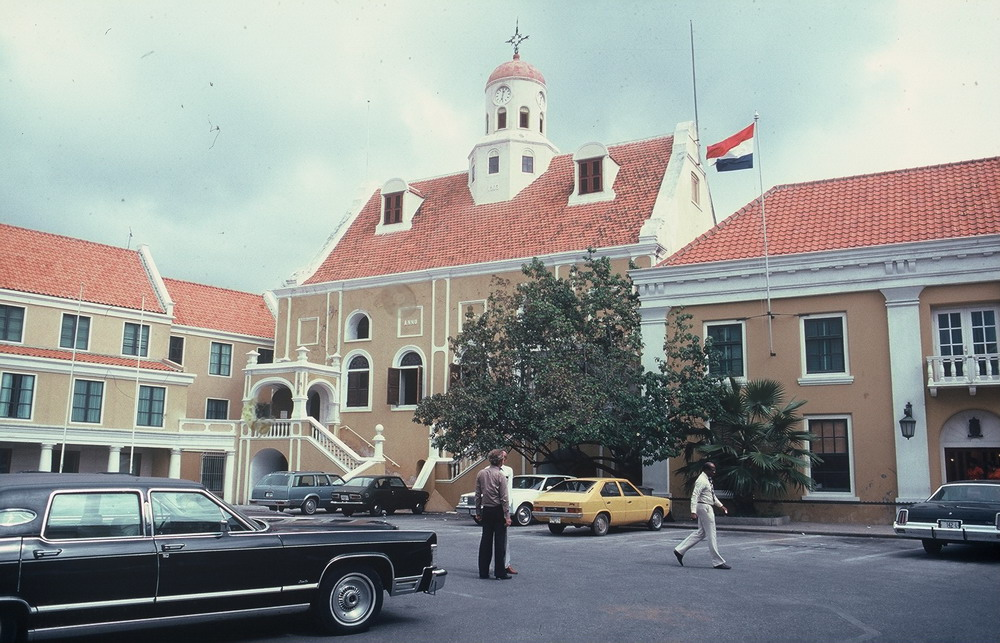
Fort Church (1980-1983)
