= Walt & El Grupo =

2008 film by Theodore Thomas

- Directed by: Theodore Thomas
- Written by: Theodore Thomas
- Produced by: Kuniko Okubo
- Cinematography: Shana Hagan
- Edited by: Lisa Palattella
- Music by: James Stemple
- Production companies: Walt Disney Family Foundation Films; Theodore Thomas Productions
- Distributed by: Walt Disney Studios Motion Pictures (Note: Distributed under the label, Walt Disney Pictures, but the logo doesn't appeared in the beginning and credited instead as Walt Disney Studios in the beginning and in the end of the film)
- Release date: September 9, 2009
- Running time: 107 minutes
- Country: United States
- Language: English

Walt & El Grupo is a 2009 American documentary film written and directed by Theodore Thomas.

== Summary ==
A presentation of Walt Disney Family Foundation Films, the film tells the story of Walt Disney's 1941 U.S. Government sponsored trip to Latin and South America where he and a group of artists gathered material which would be used to create the two Disney animated feature films Saludos Amigos (1942) and The Three Caballeros (1944).
