= Condorito =

Chilean comic book and comic strip series

- Author: René Pepo Ríos
- Website: Condorito Online
- Current status/schedule: Current daily strip
- Launch date: 6 August 1949; 77 years ago (in Okey); December 1955; 70 years ago (own magazine)
- Syndicate(s): United Feature Syndicate (c. 1949–1993); Universal Press Syndicate/Universal Uclick (1994–c. 2010)
- Publisher(s): Inverzag, S.A. Editorial Zig-Zag (1949–1971); Editorial Pinsel (1971–1994); Editorial Televisa Chile, S.A. (1994–2019); World Editors Chile (2020–present)
- Genre: Comical
- Original language: Spanish

Condorito (Spanish: [kondoˈɾito], transl. Little Condor) is a Chilean comic book and comic strip series that features an anthropomorphic condor living in a fictitious town named Pelotillehue, a typical small Chilean provincial town. He is meant to be a representation of the Chilean people.

Condorito was first published on August 6, 1949, created by the Chilean cartoonist René Ríos, known as Pepo. Condorito is very popular throughout Latin America, where the character is considered part of the general popular culture. Condorito and his friends appear in a daily comic strip.

By 2012, Condorito was in 105 Spanish-language newspapers distributed in 19 countries, including Canada, United States, Italy, and Japan. 1,369 million of its comic strips are published annually, being together with Mafalda the most relevant Hispanic comic book character in the world.

== Characteristics ==
One peculiar characteristic of Condorito is that the character, after going through an embarrassing moment or being the butt of the joke in a given strip, almost always falls backwards to the floor (legs visible or out of frame) in the final panel, although new comic strips have now put the victim of the joke looking at the reader instead. This classic comic strip "flop take" is accompanied by a free-fall onomatopoeic sound (usually ¡Plop!). From time to time, this is replaced by the victim of the joke saying ¡Exijo una explicación! ("I demand an explanation!"), usually as a twist or downbeat ending. Another catchphrase, usual for Condorito, but used with almost all the characters, is "Reflauta", to show frustration or other emotions.

The comic styles that predominate in Condorito are white humor and satire. The edition is very careful so that profanity or obscenities do not appear. White humor is generated from situations that are resolved in a ridiculous or extraordinary way.

In order for readers in other Spanish-speaking countries to understand the jokes, many of them had to be modified: excessively marked Chileanisms were removed and certain references to Chile were stopped.

Over the years, Condorito character has grown, being now older than in his beginnings, and even with a bigger belly.

According to Alberto Montt, manager of the World Editors company:

«Condorito's success is based on the fact that it shares the Hispanic idiosyncrasy that has a different humor than the Anglo. He embodies the Latin American dream of living to have fun».

— Alberto Montt

=== Comic traits ===
In Condorito, stereotypes for characters and situations are regularly used, although in general the humor is white, they reflect the mentality and habitual humor of past decades: jokes about the crazy or insane, stupid, drunk, infidelity, machismo, ethnic, medical and sick, usurers, peasants recently arrived in the city, etc.

Generally, when kiosks are drawn, apart from the newspaper El Hocicón, they display various magazines that parody well-known international magazines in their names. Thus we have: Vanidosa by Vanidades, Cosmopolita by Cosmopolitan, Bad Housekeeping by Good Housekeeping, Unpopular Mechanics by Popular Mechanics, FeoMundo by GeoMundo, Ideas para robar by Ideas para su hogar, Yo by Tú, Spicnik by Sputnik, Sinlecciones by Selecciones, Conozca Menos by Conozca Más, Vago por Vogue, Nada Interesante by Muy Interesante, El Humorista by El Economista, Casos by Cosas, among other. Likewise, they usually also sell magazines supposedly for adults since a half-naked woman almost always appears on their covers.

On the other hand, and depending on the situation, Condorito himself appears represented as belonging to different races or cultures: although he is white, he frequently appears as black or oriental. In addition, colloquial language is used to reinforce the verbal abuse of which the characters are victims ("gross huaso", "roto marginal", "peeled", etc.).

== Cartoonists and collaborators ==
As the frequency of publication of the Condorito magazine increased, Pepo had to form a team of cartoonists and collaborators. Among the first were Renato Andrade Alarcón "Nato" (1921-2006), Jorge Carvallo Muñoz "Jorcar" (1932-2017), Ricardo González Paredes "Ric" (1936-2011) and Eduardo de la Barra (cartoonist) (1942-2013), Hernán Vidal "Hervi" (b. 1943) and Guillermo Durán Castro "Guidu" (b. 1946). Later, Alberto Vivanco Ortiz (b. 1939) also collaborated and Víctor Hugo Aguirre Abarca "Tom" (b. 1944). Other people who joined the Condorito team between the 50s and 60s were Jorge Délano Concha (b. 1958), Daniel Fernández, Marta García, Luis Peñaloza, Nelson Pérez (lyricist), Sergio Nawrath, Samuel "Sam" Gana Godoy (1932-2016), Dino Gnecco Zavallia (1935-2014), Edmundo Pezoa Cartagena (b. 1943), Christian Pardow Smith (1945-2002) and Luis Osses Asenjo (1947-2018).

In the decades from the 70s to the 90s, in addition to previous members such as Gana, Osses, Pardow and Gnecco, the team was integrated at different stages and as a stable member or collaborator, among others, by Osvaldo Fernández, Manuel Ferrada, José Luis Gaete Calderón (b. 1953), Rubén Eyzaguirre Santis (b. 1960) Víctor Figueroa Barra, Mario Igor Vargas (1929-1995), Avelino García Llorente (n. 1932), Nelson Soto (n. 1937), Luis Caracuel Saavedra (b. 1959), Sergio González Barrios (b. 1959), Elizabeth Villalón, Lorenzo Mejías "Loren", Emiliano Zúñiga (lyricist), Vicente "Vicho" Plaza Santibáñez (b. 1961) and Jorge Montealegre Iturra (screenwriter, b. 1954). From the 1990s and in the first decades of the 21st century, it is worth mentioning Juan Cano Alcayaga (lyricist, b. 1943), Juan Enrique Plaza Vera (1958-2022), Luis Sepúlveda Suazo (b. 1959), Ivy Pardow Olivares, Álvaro Flores Sepúlveda, Mario Meneses Labrin, and Rodrigo Boettcher Retamal.

== Characters ==
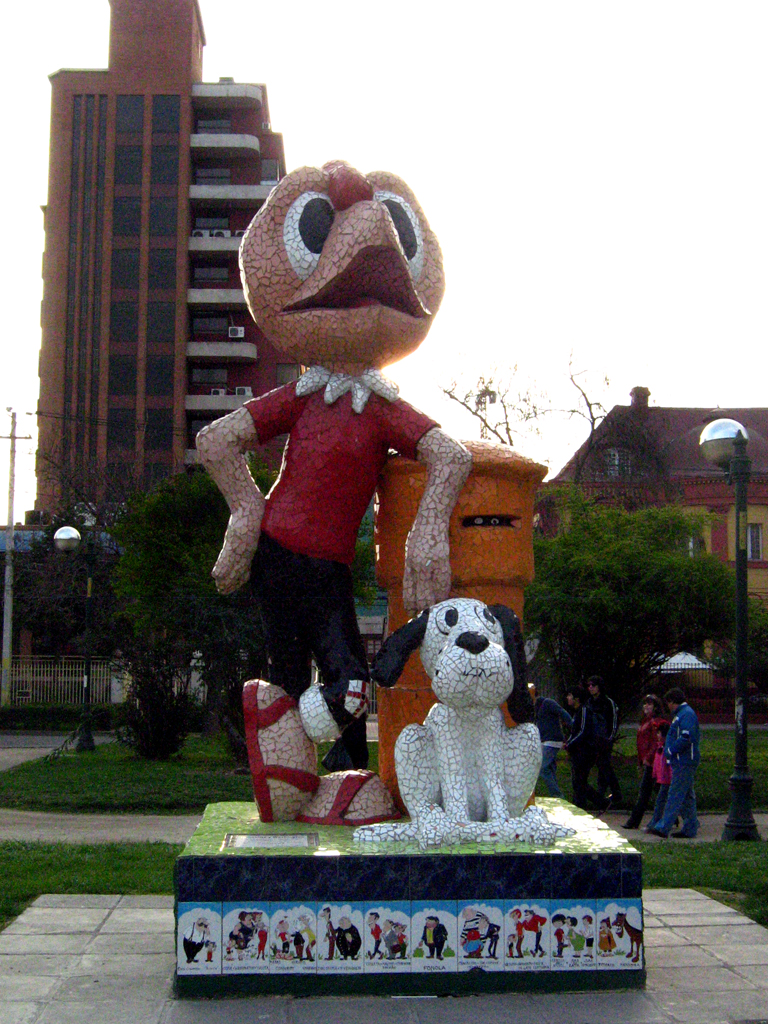
A statue of "Condorito" and "Washington" in San Miguel (Santiago Province, Chile)

- Condorito: The main character, Condorito is a lower class anthropomorphic condor, lackadaisical and unambitious, but also kind, loyal, friendly and ingenious.
- Yayita: Condorito's "fashionable eternal fiancée". She loves him but hates his reluctance to discuss marriage.
- Don Chuma: Condorito's best, most loyal friend, he is a tall, thin, kind man who helps Condorito to solve some of his problems.
- Pepe Cortisona: Condorito's nemesis, especially when it comes to courting Yayita.
- Coné: Condorito's young nephew. Coné had a series of his own, aimed at younger audiences, and its supporting cast included many of his uncle's friends' children.
- Yuyito: Yayita's tomboyish niece and Coné's best friend and partner in crime.
- Don Cuasimodo and Doña Tremebunda Vinagre: Yayita's fat, grumpy and overprotective parents.
- Garganta de Lata ("Tin Throat"): A tall, jolly, thin redhead with a typical alcoholic's nose. He spends most of his time at the "Bar El Tufo" ("The Stench Bar") or sleeping off a hangover in the street.
- Ungenio Gonzalez: A not-so-smart pal of Condorito.
- Huevoduro ("Hard-Boiled Egg"): A potbellied, egg-headed, completely white character whom Rios claims is based upon a very pale, bald Canadian ambassador.
- Chuleta: A tall, thin, jolly man with huge teeth, long sideburns, a thin mustache and green skin. ("Chuleta" is Chilean slang for "sideburn".)
- Don Máximo Tacaño ("Mr. Maximum Stingy"): A humorous miser who would rather die than part with his money. Originally, there was a stereotypical and amoral Jewish moneylender in his place (variably called Don Jacoibo or Don Salomón), but this character was replaced due to complaints.
- Padre Venancio: Pelotillehue's Roman Catholic priest.
- Tomate ("Tomato"): Short, fat, shy and bald, his head resembles a tomato, since his face is permanently red due to his shyness.
- Comegato ("Cat Eater"): A friend of Condorito who has a feline face and wears a beret and a black turtleneck. As his name suggests, he frequently hunts and eats cats, much to his friends' disgust.
- Cabellos de ángel ("Angel Hair"): Big-nosed, half-shaven and potbellied, his hair is like a sea urchin.
- Chacalito ("Little Jackal"): A criminal character, usually seen in jail or on trial for his crimes, which range from stealing to homicide.
- Che Copete: A stereotypical Argentine character who resembles an old-fashioned tango singer.
- Titicaco: A Bolivian indigena character who wears a typical colla hat and is very friendly with everyone. He was removed from the cast in the late 1980s, as he was seen as a stereotypical indio from the altiplano. He is not a cholo, as cholos in Bolivia are urban mestizos.
- Fonola: A huge, hairy man about the same size as Pepe Cortisona, but without the teeth and with a huge voice ("Fonola" is slang for "phonograph").
- Washington, Mandíbula and Matías: Condorito's pets. Washington is his dog, Mandíbula ("Jaw") his horse, and Matías his potty-mouthed parrot.
- Juan Sablazo: The typical conman who puts up a sob story or a good excuse in order to borrow money and never pays it back.
- Doña Peta, a.k.a. "Misiá Petita": A big, round, gentle, middle-aged housewife who is a neighbor of Condorito.
- Condor Otto and Huevo Fritz: Variations on Condorito and Huevoduro, but characters in their own right. They are German or German-descended characters usually used to tell jokes with obvious puns or very dumb punchlines.
- Emiliano: A very poor worker, he is frequently seen wanting a raise and stretching his hand under the door of the boss, usually being ignored.
- San Guchito: Although not generally a character, he is the patron saint of Pelotillehue. He is usually shown in benediction, holding a sandwich in his left hand.
- Don Sata: Satan himself. Normally he tries to corrupt Condorito and friends by offering them power, riches, etc.
- San Pedro ("Saint Peter"): Is the gatekeeper of Heaven, and decides who enters paradise.
- Maca and Potoca: Two young and beautiful girls created as recurrent "filler" characters for jokes involving nudity or risqué situations.

== Publishing trajectory ==
=== Origins ===
The first Condorito collection, published in Chile in 1955

In 1942, the Walt Disney Company created the animated film Saludos Amigos depicting Donald Duck and a cast of anthropomorphic characters representing various nations of the Americas: Argentina, Brazil, Colombia, Mexico and Peru. In the film, while the Disney characters are represented as humorous versions of charros, gauchos, etc., Chile was represented as Pedro, a small airplane engaged in his very first flight, whose attempt to fly over the Andes to pick up air mail from Mendoza is humorously depicted. Pepo created Condorito in response to what he perceived as a slight to the image of Chile.

The first publication of a Condorito comic strip was in the first issue of Okey magazine, owned by Zig-Zag, on August 6, 1949. In it, Condorito appeared as a thief of occasional chickens, who later regrets eating them. and tries to return it to the chicken coop but is stopped by a police officer and imprisoned. In the Condorito prison, he imagined the policeman eating the tasty chicken. The comic strip was two full pages long.

Condorito's following publications were based on a character who came from the countryside driven by the rural-urban migration that lived in Chile during the 1950s; Condorito's personality was that of a joker, witty and mischievous. According to screenwriter Jorge Montealegre, «Condorito's profile in the first cartoons is focused on the Chilean roto [...] where very Chilean institutions are addressed, such as the compadrazgo with Don Chuma and the huacherío through Coné».

During the Okey magazine editions, Condorito was given a real context in a fictitious town, Pelotillehue, along with family members and situations closer to people.

By 1955, the year of the appearance of the first collection of Condorito jokes, the character already had its definitive appearance. As a publication, Condorito appeared on December 21 of that year. The comic strip Condorito has a characteristic format by which it has been published from its origins in a specific range of colors that only include red, brown, pink, black, white, gray and, from time to time, the green.

One of the only surviving cartoonists who worked with Pepo at the beginning of Condorito is the cartoonist Hernán Vidal (Hervi) who, at just 13 years old, became Pepo's assistant.

=== Popularization ===
In 1961, Condorito began to be published twice a year. From number 7 to number 82 they were called «Condoritos numerados» (Numbered Condoritos) because they had their prominent numbering on the cover. Condorito's book number 9, which came out in 1962, was dedicated to the Soccer World Cup held that same year in Chile. From 1965 to 1982, it was published irregularly; however, it began to be published regularly on a quarterly basis starting in 1970, and did so until the last issue of 1979.

=== Internationalization ===
In 1974 the first products related to Condorito came out in coloring books. In February 1975, the first Condorito compilation came out, called Especial Condorito: Clásicos de la historieta (Condorito Special: Comic Classics). For Christmas 1975, the first Condorito toys came out: some Condorito and Coné dolls. In 1976 the international rights to Condorito were acquired by Editors Press Service, a subsidiary of the Evening Post Publishing Company. In Argentina in 1977, the first international edition of Condorito came out. Also in 1977, Editorial América and Bloque Dearmas began publishing the magazine in Colombia and Venezuela. In 1979 the last Condorito comics where he smokes appeared.

The 1980s were the best time for Condorito: Starting with the first edition of the 1980s, Condorito became a bimonthly publication.3 In February 1979, the first of a series of extraordinary editions went on sale of excellent quality and in giant size with hard covers and dimensions of 32 × 21.5 cm, except for one, (Condorito Campeón) of dimensions 26 × 18 cm. The collection was titled Selección de Oro de la revista Condorito (Gold Selection of Condorito magazine), and consisted of the following eleven numbers, each of them 64 pages:

N.º	Title	Publication	Format
1	Condorito Campeón (Condorito Champion)	February 1979	26x18 cm
2	Condorito en el Far West (Condorito in the Far West)	March 1980	32×21,5 cm
3	Condorito Superstar	June 1980	32×21,5 cm
4	Condorito Doctor	September 1980	32×21,5 cm
5	Condorito en el Hampa (Condorito in the Underworld)	March 1981	32×21,5 cm
6	Condorito en la Historia (Condorito in the History)	June 1981	32×21,5 cm
7	Condorito en la Selva (Condorito in the Jungle)	September 1981	32×21,5 cm
8	Condorito en Uniforme (Condorito in Uniform)	March 1982	32×21,5 cm
9	Condorito en el Mundialazo (Condorito in the World Cup)	June 1982	32×21,5 cm
10	Condorito en Automóvil (Condorito in Car)	October 1982	32×21,5 cm
11	Condorito Gastrónomo (Gourmet Condorito)	1983	32×21,5 cm

In 1982, Condorito came out nine times a year. That same year, the first non-Hispanic edition of Condorito appeared, published in Brazil. In October 1982, Coné el Travieso (Coné the Naughty) came out for the first time, a pocket-sized magazine that appeared monthly with jokes about Condorito's naughty nephew that appeared in number 22 of 1967. Coné el Travieso, in addition to the usual Coné and Yuyito, new characters were added, such as Huevito, Genito, Fonolita, Tacañito and Gargantita. In 1983 Condorito was published regularly in a monthly magazine format, and it did so until 1989. In 1986 the first special editions came out. In 1987 the first Libro de Oro (Golden Book) in Mexico was published, which, from 2004, became the Libro Gigante de Oro (Golden Giant Book) and since 2006 includes puzzles to solve called Condoripuzzles. In 1988, Juegos Condorito (Condorito Games) appeared, a quarterly publication. Between 1989 and 2019, Condorito magazine was published every fortnight.

== Condorito and politics ==
Condorito through the 1960s and 1970s held to a conservative perspective on Chile and its society, poking fun at both the new left-wing poets and the hippies. At the first age of the comic, the jokes usually have a very basic context and themes, like African people always represented as primitive cannibals, women as bad drivers or as a jealous wife waiting for her husband to come back from a party, etc.

After the military coup of 1973, some Chilean cartoonists were censored by the military regime, yet unlike other publications (such as the Argentinian Mafalda), which combined criticism of society with humor, Condorito, which lacked the former, continued to be published. Since that time, many Chilean comics with a political view on society (e.g. Hervi's Super Cifuentes) have been forgotten. Condorito remains the best-known Chilean comic book character.

== Film ==
In commemoration of its 66th anniversary of the launch of the comic strip, an animated film adaptation was released on October 12, 2017 in Latin America, by 20th Century Fox and in the United States on January 12, 2018, by Pantelion Films.
