= Pepo (cartoonist) =

Chilean cartoonist

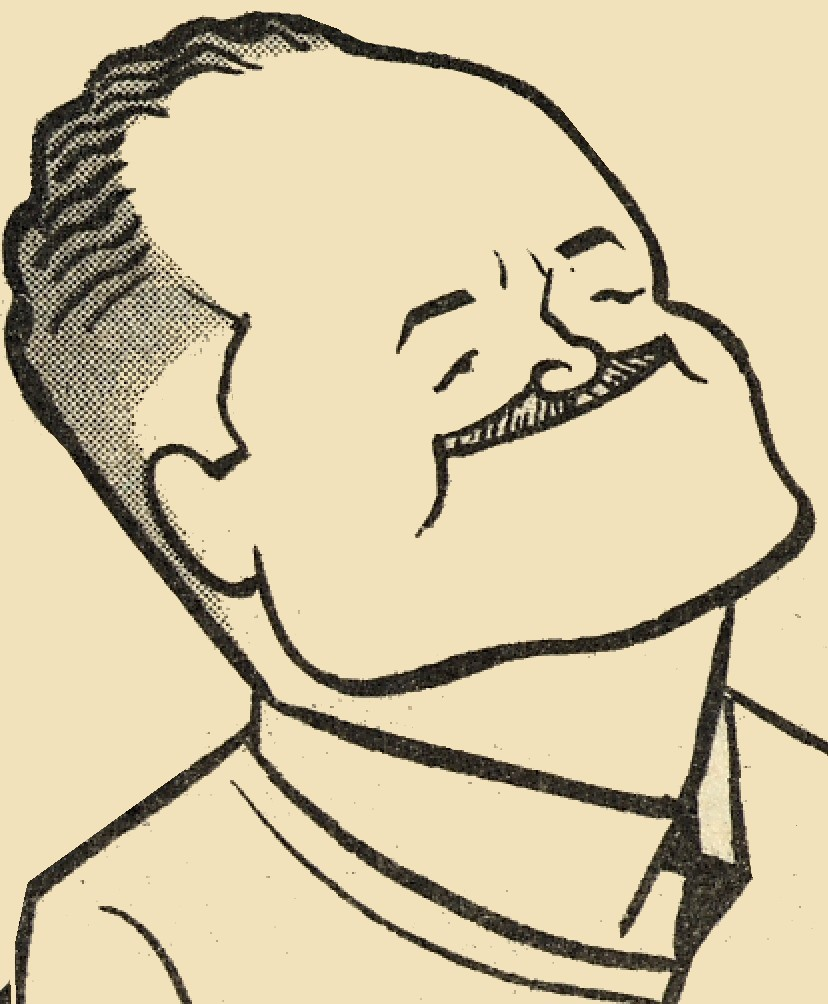
- Self-caricature by Pepo
- Born: René Rodolfo Ríos Boettiger; 15 December 1911 Concepción, Chile
- Died: 14 July 2000 (aged 88) Santiago, Chile
- Areas: Writer, Artist
- Notable works: Condorito; Viborita; CanCan; Pobre Diablo; Pingüino
- Children: 2

René Ríos Boettiger (Concepción, 15 December 1911 — 14 July 2000), also known as Pepo, was a Chilean cartoonist, creator of the famous character Condorito. He has been credited as the most prominent Chilean graphic humorist of the 20th century.

== Biography ==
He was the son of the marriage of Amanda Boettiger Krause and the doctor René Ríos Guzmán. He published his first cartoon at the age of 7 in the newspaper El Sur of Concepción. Encouraged by his father, he continued with his drawings until he held his first exhibition, at the age of 10, at the Palet confectionery in his city. Although he studied medicine at the Universidad de Concepción, Rios abandoned his studies in the early 1930s to devote all his time to creating his cartoons. In 1932 he moved to Santiago to work as a cartoonist at the satirical magazine Topaze. Adopting the pseudonym "Pepo" (from pepón, "little barrel", his childhood nickname), he created the comic strip Don Gabito for the magazine, a strip featuring a caricatured Chilean president Gabriel González Videla. He also caricatured president Pedro Aguirre Cerda as Don Pedrito.

In 1949 he created Condorito, his most famous character, taking the idea from the condor of the Chilean coat of arms.

Over the next sixty years Rios contributed cartoons to a great number of publications, including El Pingüino, Ganso, Pobre Diablo, Can Can, Pichanga, El Saquero, El Peneca, and branched out into other forms of illustration as well. Rios died of cancer in 2000 at the age of 88.

A great lover of the seaside, Rios often drew while looking at the sea at El Quisco on the Chilean Central Coast. A statue of Condorito now stands at the location. In 2000, an effort led by Omar Pérez Santiago (a scholar of Chilean cartooning and a co-founder of the academic Chilean Center for Comics) resulted in a sculpture of Condorito memorializing Rios being installed in the Chilean House of Culture in San Miguel.
