= Index of Netherlands Antilles–related articles =

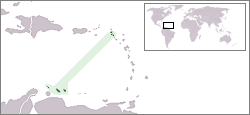
The location of the former nation of the Netherlands Antilles

The following is an alphabetical list of topics related to the former nation of the Netherlands Antilles.

== 0–9 ==
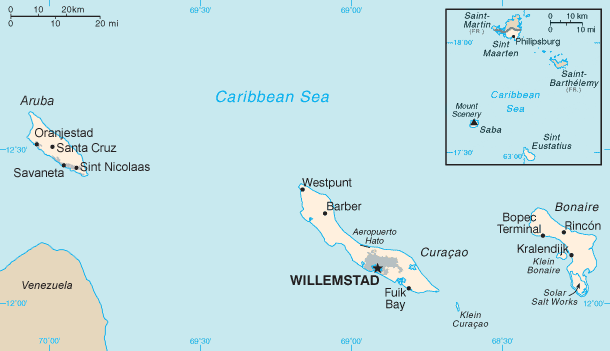
A map of the former Netherlands Antilles

- .an – Internet country code top-level domain for the Netherlands Antilles

== A ==
- ABC islands
- Adjacent country:

Saint Martin

- Air Force of the Netherlands Antilles
- Americas
  - North America
    - North Atlantic Ocean
      - West Indies
        - Caraïbische Zee (Caribbean Sea)
          - Antillen (Antilles)
            - Kleine Antillen (Lesser Antilles)
              - ABC Islands
                - Aruba
                - Bonaire
                - Curaçao
                - Klein Bonaire
                - Klein Curaçao
              - SSS Islands
                - Saba
                - Sint Eustatius
                - Sint Maarten (Saint Martin)
- Antillenhuis, the cabinet of the minister plenipotentiary of the Netherlands Antilles in the Hague
- Antilles
- Army of the Netherlands Antilles
- Atlantic Ocean
- Atlas of the Netherlands Antilles

== B ==
- BES Islands — a genuine abbreviation for the islands of Bonaire, Sint Eustatuis, and Saba

== C ==
Coat of arms of the Netherlands Antilles

Coat of arms of the Netherlands Antilles after Aruba seceded in 1986

- Capital of the Netherlands Antilles: Willemstad on Curaçao
- Caribbean
- Caribbean Netherlands (the BES Islands as separate from Curaçao and Sint Maarten)
- Caribbean Community (CARICOM)
- Caribbean Sea
- Categories:
  - Category:Netherlands Antilles
    - Category:Bonaire
    - Category:Curaçao
    - Category:Saba (island)
    - Category:Sint Eustatius
    - Category:Sint Maarten
    - Category:Communications in the Netherlands Antilles
    - Category:Culture of the Netherlands Antilles
    - Category:Dutch Antillean people
    - Category:Economy of the Netherlands Antilles
    - Category:Education in the Netherlands Antilles
    - Category:Environment of the Netherlands Antilles
    - Category:Geography of the Netherlands Antilles
    - Category:Government of the Netherlands Antilles
    - Category:History of the Netherlands Antilles
    - Category:Netherlands Antilles stubs
    - Category:Netherlands Antilles-related lists
    - Category:Politics of the Netherlands Antilles
    - Category:Society of the Netherlands Antilles
    - Category:Sport in the Netherlands Antilles
    - Category:Transport in the Netherlands Antilles
  - commons:Category:Netherlands Antilles
- Cities of the Netherlands Antilles
- Climate of the Netherlands Antilles
- Coast guard – Netherlands Antilles & Aruba Coast Guard
- Coat of arms of the Netherlands Antilles
- Constitution of the Netherlands Antilles

== D ==
- Demographics of the Netherlands Antilles
- Divi-divi
- Dutch colonization of the Americas
- Dutch language

== E ==
- Economy of the Netherlands Antilles
- Elections in the Netherlands Antilles
- English language

== F ==
Flag of the Netherlands Antilles

Flag of the Netherlands Antilles after Aruba seceded in 1986

- Flag of the Netherlands Antilles

== G ==
- Geography of the Netherlands Antilles
- Government of the Netherlands Antilles

== H ==
- History of the Netherlands Antilles

== I ==
- International Organization for Standardization (ISO)
  - ISO 3166-1 alpha-2 country code for the Netherlands Antilles: AN
  - ISO 3166-1 alpha-3 country code for the Netherlands Antilles: ANT
- Internet in the Netherlands Antilles
- Islands of the Caribbean
- Islands of the Netherlands Antilles:
  - Bonaire
    - Klein Bonaire
  - Curaçao
    - Klein Curaçao
  - Saba
  - Sint Eustatius
  - Sint Maarten, the southern portion of the island of Saint Martin
  - minor islands:
    - Camia, Netherlands Antilles
    - Cow and Calf
    - Green Island, Netherlands Antilles
    - Guana Cay
    - Hen and Chicken
    - Isla Makuka
    - Kadoesji
    - Little Island, Netherlands Antilles
    - Little Key, Netherlands Antilles
    - Mal Aborder
    - Meeuwtje
    - Mollibeday Rots
    - Mona Island, Netherlands Antilles
    - Pelican Island, Netherlands Antilles
    - Penso, Netherlands Antilles
    - Rancho, Netherlands Antilles
    - Sapate Eliand
    - Willemberg

== K ==
- Kingdom of the Netherlands (Koninkrijk der Nederlanden)
- A.J. van Koolwijk

== L ==
- Lesser Antilles
- Lists related to the Netherlands Antilles:
  - List of airports in the Netherlands Antilles
  - List of birds of the Netherlands Antilles
  - List of cities in the Netherlands Antilles
  - List of countries by GDP (nominal)
  - List of islands of the Netherlands Antilles
  - List of Netherlands Antilles-related topics
  - List of political parties in the Netherlands Antilles
  - List of rivers of the Netherlands Antilles
  - List of universities in the Netherlands Antilles
  - List of volcanoes in the Netherlands Antilles
  - List of World Heritage Sites in the Netherlands Antilles
  - Topic outline of the Netherlands Antilles

== M ==
- Jossy Mansur, writer
- Military of the Netherlands Antilles
- Music of the Netherlands Antilles

== N ==
- Netherlands Antilles (Nederlandse Antillen)
- North America
- Northern Hemisphere

== O ==
- Outline of the Netherlands Antilles

== P ==
- Papiamento language
- Politics of the Netherlands Antilles
- Postage stamps and postal history of the Netherlands Antilles
- Prime Minister of the Netherlands Antilles

== S ==
- Scouting Antiano
- Scouting in the Netherlands Antilles
- South America
- SSS islands

== T ==
- Telecommunications in the Netherlands Antilles
- Topic outline of the Netherlands Antilles
- Transport in the Netherlands Antilles

== U ==
- United States-Netherlands Antilles relations

== W ==
- Western Hemisphere
- Wikimedia Atlas of the Netherlands Antilles
- Wikipedia:WikiProject Topic outline/Drafts/Topic outline of the Netherlands Antilles
- Willemstad on Curaçao – Capital of the Netherlands Antilles

== See also ==
- List of Caribbean-related topics
- List of international rankings
- Lists of country-related topics
- Topic outline of geography
- Topic outline of North America
- Topic outline of South America
- Topic outline of the Netherlands Antilles
