= Outline of the Netherlands Antilles =

Overview of and topical guide to the Netherlands Antilles

The Flag of the Netherlands Antilles

The Coat of arms of the Netherlands Antilles

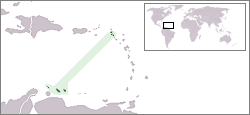
Location of the Netherlands Antilles

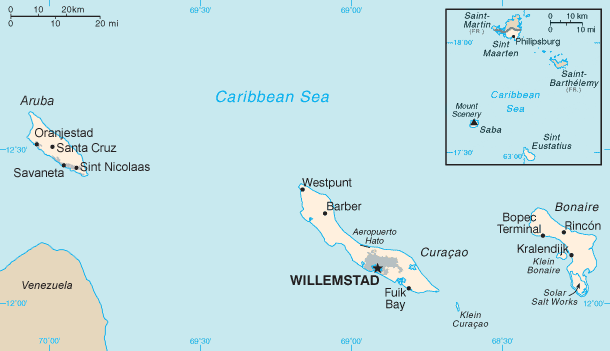
Map of the Netherlands Antilles

The following outline is provided as an overview of and topical guide to the Netherlands Antilles:

Netherlands Antilles – former autonomous Caribbean country within the Kingdom of the Netherlands, consisting of two groups of islands in the Lesser Antilles: Aruba, Curaçao and Bonaire, in Leeward Antilles just off the Venezuelan coast; and Sint Eustatius, Saba and Sint Maarten, in the Leeward Islands southeast of the Virgin Islands. Aruba seceded in 1986 as a separate country within the Kingdom of the Netherlands, and the rest of the Netherlands Antilles was dissolved on 10 October 2010, resulting in two new constituent countries, Curaçao and Sint Maarten, with the other islands joining the Netherlands as special municipalities.

== General reference ==
- Pronunciation:
- Common English country name: The Netherlands Antilles
- Official English country name: The Netherlands Antilles of the Kingdom of the Netherlands
- Common endonym(s):
- Official endonym(s):
- Adjectival(s): Dutch Antillean
- Demonym(s):
- ISO country codes: AN, ANT, 530
- ISO region codes: See ISO 3166-2:AN
- Internet country code top-level domain: .an

== Geography of the Netherlands Antilles ==
- Netherlands Antilles was: a territory of the Netherlands
  - Dissolved: 10 October 2010,
- Location:
  - Northern Hemisphere and Western Hemisphere
    - North America (though not on the mainland)
  - Atlantic Ocean
    - North Atlantic
      - Caribbean
        - Antilles
          - Lesser Antilles (island chain)
  - Time zone: Eastern Caribbean Time (UTC-04)
  - Extreme points of the Netherlands Antilles
    - High: Mount Scenery on Saba 870 m (2,854 ft)
    - Low: Caribbean Sea 0 m
  - Land boundaries: Saint Martin 15 km
  - Coastline: Caribbean Sea 364 km
- Atlas of the Netherlands Antilles

=== Environment of the Netherlands Antilles ===
- Wildlife of the Netherlands Antilles
  - List of Lepidoptera of the Netherlands Antilles
  - List of mammals of the Netherlands Antilles

==== Natural geographic features of the Netherlands Antilles ====
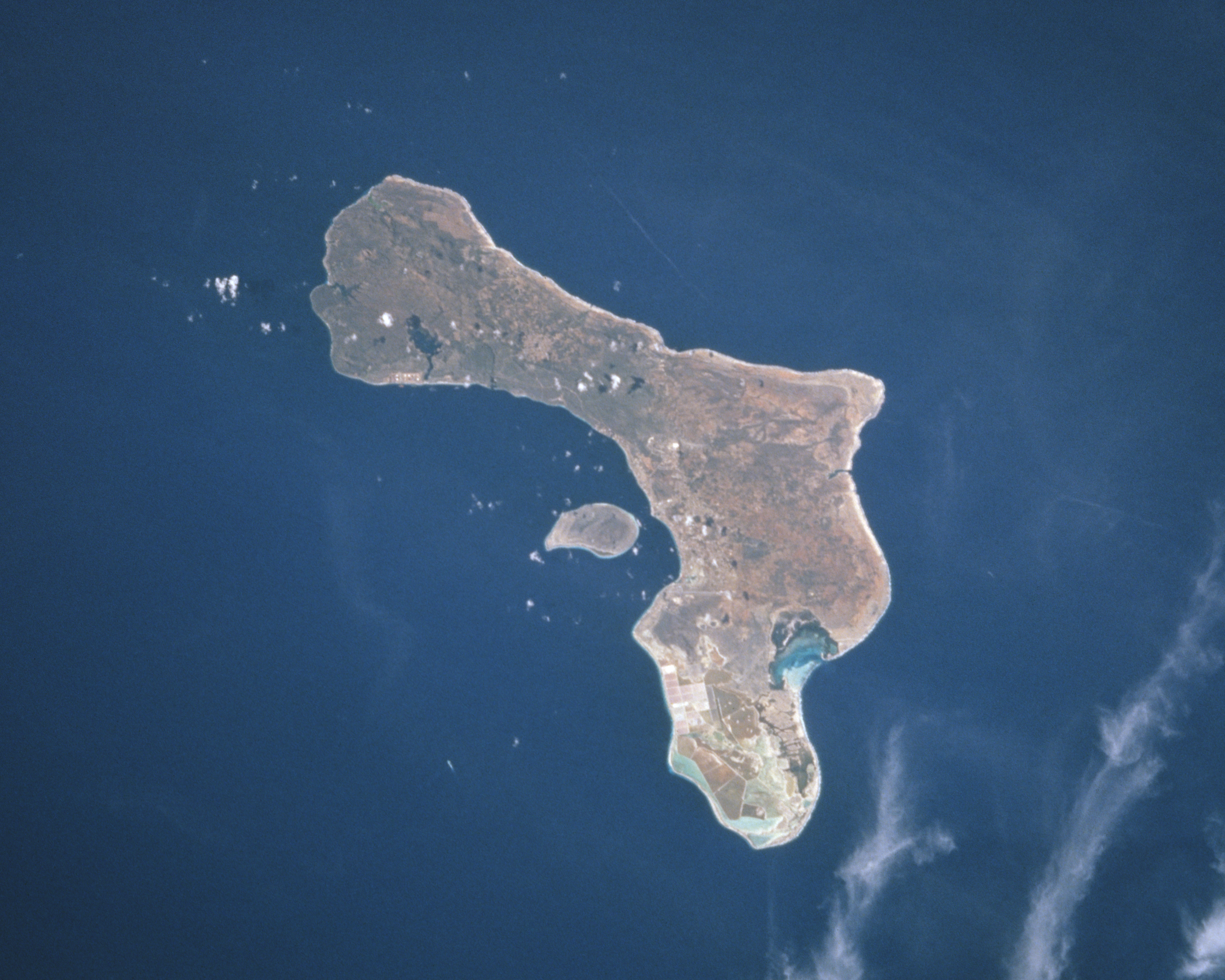
Satellite image of Bonaire

- Islands of the Netherlands Antilles:
  - Aruba
  - Bonaire
  - Curaçao
  - Saba
  - Sint Eustatius
  - Sint Maarten
- Volcanoes in the Netherlands Antilles
- World Heritage Sites in the Netherlands Antilles

=== Regions of the Netherlands Antilles ===
==== Administrative divisions of the Netherlands Antilles ====
- Island territories of the Netherlands Antilles
- List of cities in the Netherlands Antilles

=== Demography of the Netherlands Antilles ===
Demographics of the Netherlands Antilles

== Government and politics of the Netherlands Antilles ==
Politics of the Netherlands Antilles

- Form of government: parliamentary representative democratic country
- Capital of the Netherlands Antilles: Willemstad
- Elections in the Netherlands Antilles
- Political parties in the Netherlands Antilles

=== Branches of government of the Netherlands Antilles ===
Government of the Netherlands Antilles

==== Executive branch of the Netherlands Antilles ====
- Head of state: Monarchy of the Netherlands
  - Governor of the Netherlands Antilles (representative of the King)
- Head of government: Prime Minister of the Netherlands Antilles,
  - List of prime ministers of the Netherlands Antilles
- Cabinet of the Netherlands Antilles: the Prime Minister headed an eight-member Cabinet.

==== Legislative branch of the Netherlands Antilles ====
- Parliament (unicameral): Estates of the Netherlands Antilles

==== Judicial branch of the Netherlands Antilles ====
- Supreme Court of the Netherlands – dealt with final appeals from the Joint Court of Justice (below).
- Joint Court of Justice of the Netherlands Antilles and Aruba – dealt with civil, criminal, and administrative (e.g. tax) cases.

==== International organization membership of the Netherlands Antilles ====
The government of the Netherlands Antilles was a member of:

- Caribbean Community and Common Market (Caricom) (observer)
- International Criminal Police Organization (Interpol)
- International Labour Organization (ILO)
- International Monetary Fund (IMF)
- International Olympic Committee (IOC)
- United Nations Educational, Scientific, and Cultural Organization (UNESCO) (associate)
- Universal Postal Union (UPU)
- World Confederation of Labour (WCL)
- World Customs Organization (WCO)
- World Meteorological Organization (WMO)
- World Tourism Organization (UNWTO) (associate)

=== Law and order in the Netherlands Antilles ===
- Constitution of the Netherlands Antilles
- Islands Regulation of the Netherlands Antilles
- Law enforcement in the Netherlands Antilles –
  - Netherlands Antilles & Aruba Coast Guard

=== Military of the Netherlands Antilles ===
Military of the Netherlands Antilles

- Forces (Netherlands Antilles didn't have military forces of its own)
  - Army of the Netherlands Antilles
  - Air Force of the Netherlands Antilles

=== Local government of the Netherlands Antilles ===
Local government in the Netherlands Antilles

- Island councils

== History of the Netherlands Antilles ==
History of the Netherlands Antilles

- Cassard expedition
- Dissolution of the Netherlands Antilles

== Culture of the Netherlands Antilles ==
Culture of the Netherlands Antilles

- National symbols of the Netherlands Antilles
  - Coat of arms of the Netherlands Antilles
  - Flag of the Netherlands Antilles
  - National anthem of the Netherlands Antilles
- People of the Netherlands Antilles
- Religion in the Netherlands Antilles
  - Christianity in the Netherlands Antilles
  - Hinduism in the Netherlands Antilles
  - Islam in the Netherlands Antilles
  - Judaism in the Netherlands Antilles
- World Heritage Sites in the Netherlands Antilles

=== Arts of the Netherlands Antilles ===
- Music of the former Netherlands Antilles

=== Sports in the Netherlands Antilles ===
Sports in the Netherlands Antilles

- Football in the Netherlands Antilles
  - List of football clubs in the Netherlands Antilles
  - Netherlands Antilles national football team
  - Netherlands Antilles national under-20 football team
  - Netherlands Antilles women's national football team
  - Netherlands Antilles Championship
- Netherlands Antilles at the Olympics
  - Netherlands Antilles Olympic Committee
  - Netherlands Antilles at the Summer Olympics
    - Netherlands Antilles at the 1952 Summer Olympics
    - Netherlands Antilles at the 1960 Summer Olympics
    - Netherlands Antilles at the 1964 Summer Olympics
    - Netherlands Antilles at the 1968 Summer Olympics
    - Netherlands Antilles at the 1972 Summer Olympics
    - Netherlands Antilles at the 1976 Summer Olympics
    - Netherlands Antilles at the 1984 Summer Olympics
    - Netherlands Antilles at the 1988 Summer Olympics
    - Netherlands Antilles at the 1992 Summer Olympics
    - Netherlands Antilles at the 1996 Summer Olympics
    - Netherlands Antilles at the 2000 Summer Olympics
    - Netherlands Antilles at the 2004 Summer Olympics
    - Netherlands Antilles at the 2008 Summer Olympics
  - Netherlands Antilles at the Winter Olympics
    - Netherlands Antilles at the 1988 Winter Olympics
    - Netherlands Antilles at the 1992 Winter Olympics
- Netherlands Antilles at the Pan American Games
  - Netherlands Antilles at the 1991 Pan American Games
  - Netherlands Antilles at the 1999 Pan American Games
  - Netherlands Antilles at the 2003 Pan American Games
  - Netherlands Antilles at the 2007 Pan American Games
  - Netherlands Antilles at the 2011 Pan American Games
- Tennis in the Netherlands Antilles
  - Netherlands Antilles Davis Cup team
  - Netherlands Antilles Tennis Federation
- Other
  - Netherlands Antilles at the 2009 World Championships in Athletics
  - Netherlands Antilles at the 2010 Central American and Caribbean Games
  - Netherlands Antilles at the 2010 Summer Youth Olympics
  - Netherlands Antilles at the 2012 UCI Road World Championships
  - Netherlands Antilles at the 2011 World Aquatics Championships
  - Netherlands Antilles at the 2013 World Aquatics Championships
  - Netherlands Antilles at the South American Games
  - Netherlands Antilles national baseball team
  - Netherlands Antilles women's national softball team

== Economy and infrastructure of the Netherlands Antilles ==
Economy of the Netherlands Antilles

- Economic rank, by nominal GDP (2007): 145th (one hundred and forty fifth)
- Banking in the Netherlands Antilles
- Communications in the Netherlands Antilles
  - Internet in the Netherlands Antilles
  - Postage stamps and postal history of the Netherlands Antilles
- Currency of the Netherlands Antilles: Guilder
  - ISO 4217: ANG
- Transport in the Netherlands Antilles
  - Airports in the Netherlands Antilles

== Education in the Netherlands Antilles ==
- List of universities in the Netherlands Antilles

== See also ==
Netherlands Antilles

- List of international rankings
- Outline of geography
- Outline of North America
- Outline of South America
- Outline of the Netherlands
- Netherlands Antilles general election, 2006
- Netherlands Antilles general election, 2010
