= Geography of the Netherlands Antilles =

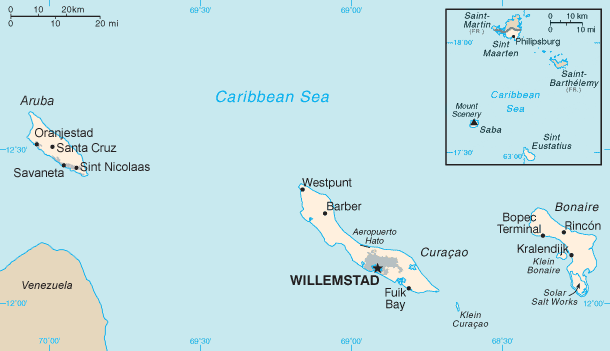
Geography of the Netherlands Antilles before the secession of Aruba in 1986.

Detailed map showing Sint-Maarten.

The Netherlands Antilles was a constituent country in the Caribbean Sea. It consisted of two island groups, the ABC islands Curaçao, Bonaire and (until 1986) Aruba just north of Venezuela, and the SSS islands east of the Virgin Islands.

The Netherlands Antilles had 960 km^{2} (1153 km^{2} before 1986) of land, which included no major lakes or other bodies of water.

Territory included the islands of Aruba until 1986 and Curaçao, Bonaire, Saba, Sint Eustatius, Sint Maarten (which is the Dutch part of the island of Saint Martin) until 2010 when the Netherlands Antilles was dissolved. Its only land boundary was with France on the island of Saint Martin, which was 10.2 kilometers in length. The Netherlands Antilles had 364 kilometers (432 km before 1986) of coastline.

== Climate ==
Tropical; ameliorated by northeast trade winds.

== Statistics ==
Maritime claims:
exclusive fishing zone: 12 nmi (22.2 km; 13.8 mi)
territorial sea: 12 nmi (22.2 km; 13.8 mi)

Terrain: generally hilly, volcanic interiors

Elevation extremes:
lowest point: Caribbean Sea 0 m
highest point: Mount Scenery 870 m (2,854 ft)

Natural resources: phosphates (Curaçao only), salt (Bonaire only)

Land use:
arable land: 10%
permanent crops: 0%
permanent pastures: 0%
forests and woodland: 0%
other: 90% (1993 est.)

Irrigated land: NA km^{2}

Natural hazards: Curaçao and Bonaire are south of Caribbean hurricane belt and are rarely threatened; Sint Maarten, Saba, and Sint Eustatius are subject to hurricanes from July to October.

Environment - current issues: NA
