= List of political parties in the Netherlands Antilles =

Political parties in the Netherlands Antilles were generally limited to one of the six islands that made up the Netherlands Antilles where they would participate in island council elections and in their Island's constituency of the Estates of the Netherlands Antilles.

After the dissolution of the Netherlands Antilles in 2010 (and the split off of Aruba in 1986), many of the parties stayed participating in the politics of their respective islands.

== The parties ==
=== Curaçao ===
- C93
- Democratic Party (Democratische Partij)
- Forsa Kòrsou
- Labour Party People's Crusade (Partido Laboral Krusada Popular)
- LPNA (Lista Niun Paso Atras)
- National People's Party (Partido Nashonal di Pueblo)
- New Antilles Movement (Movishon Antia Nobo)
- Party for the Restructured Antilles (Partido Antiá Restrukturá)
- Party Workers' Liberation Front 30th of May (Frente Obrero Liberashon 30 Di Mei 1969)
- Sovereign People (Pueblo Soberano)

=== Sint Maarten ===
- Democratic Party Sint Maarten (Democratische Partij Sint Maarten)
- National Alliance
  - Sint Maarten Patriotic Alliance
  - National Progressive Party
- People's Progressive Alliance
- United People's Party

=== Bonaire ===
- Bonaire Patriotic Union (Union Patriotico Bonairano)
- Bonaire Democratic Party (Partido Democratico Bonairano)
- Bonaire Social Party (Partido Boneriano Sosial)

=== Sint Eustatius ===
- Democratic Party
- Progressive Labour Party

=== Saba ===
- Windwards Islands People's Movement

== See also ==
- Politics of the Netherlands Antilles
- List of political parties by country
