= List of birds of the Netherlands Antilles =

This is a list of the bird species recorded in the Netherlands Antilles. The avifauna of the Netherlands Antilles include a total of 286 species, of which five have been introduced by humans and 22 are rare or accidental. Four species are globally threatened.

This list's taxonomic treatment (designation and sequence of orders, families and species) and nomenclature (common and scientific names) follow the conventions of The Clements Checklist of Birds of the World, 6th edition. The family accounts at the beginning of each heading reflect this taxonomy, as do the species counts found in each family account. Introduced and accidental species are included in the total counts for the Netherlands Antilles.

The following tags have been used to highlight several categories. The commonly occurring native species do not fall into any of these categories.

- (A) Accidental – a species that rarely or accidentally occurs in the Netherlands Antilles
- (I) Introduced – a species introduced to the Netherlands Antilles as a consequence, direct or indirect, of human actions

== Grebes ==
Order: Podicipediformes Family: Podicipedidae

Grebes are small to medium-large freshwater diving birds. They have lobed toes and are excellent swimmers and divers. However, they have their feet placed far back on the body, making them quite ungainly on land.

- Least grebe, Tachybaptus dominicus
- Pied-billed grebe, Podilymbus podiceps

== Shearwaters and petrels ==
Order: Procellariiformes Family: Procellariidae

The procellariids are the main group of medium-sized "true petrels", characterised by united nostrils with medium septum and a long outer functional primary.

- Black-capped petrel, Pterodroma hasitata
- Bulwer's petrel, Bulweria bulwerii
- Great shearwater, Ardenna gravis
- Sargasso shearwater, Puffinus lherminieri

== Storm petrels ==
Order: Procellariiformes Family: Hydrobatidae

The storm petrels are relatives of the petrels and are the smallest seabirds. They feed on planktonic crustaceans and small fish picked from the surface, typically while hovering. The flight is fluttering and sometimes bat-like.

- Wilson's storm petrel, Oceanites oceanicus
- Leach's storm petrel, Oceanodroma leucorhoa

== Tropicbirds ==
Order: Phaethontiformes Family: Phaethontidae

Tropicbirds are slender white birds of tropical oceans, with exceptionally long central tail feathers. Their heads and long wings have black markings.

- Red-billed tropicbird, Phaethon aethereus
- White-tailed tropicbird, Phaethon lepturus

== Boobies and gannets ==
Order: Suliformes Family: Sulidae

The sulids comprise the gannets and boobies. Both groups are medium to large coastal seabirds that plunge-dive for fish.

- Masked booby, Sula dactylatra
- Red-footed booby, Sula sula
- Brown booby, Sula leucogaster

== Cormorants ==
Order: Suliformes Family: Phalacrocoracidae

Phalacrocoracidae is a family of medium to large coastal, fish-eating seabirds that includes cormorants and shags. Plumage colouration varies, with the majority having mainly dark plumage, some species being black-and-white and a few being colourful.

- Double-crested cormorant, Phalacrocorax auritus
- Neotropic cormorant, Phalacrocorax brasilianus
- Great cormorant, Phalacrocorax carbo

== Frigatebirds ==
Order: Suliformes Family: Fregatidae

Frigatebirds are large seabirds usually found over tropical oceans. They are large, black-and-white or completely black, with long wings and deeply forked tails. The males have coloured inflatable throat pouches. They do not swim or walk and cannot take off from a flat surface. Having the largest wingspan-to-body-weight ratio of any bird, they are essentially aerial, able to stay aloft for more than a week.

- Magnificent frigatebird, Fregata magnificens

== Pelicans ==
Order: Pelecaniformes Family: Pelecanidae

Pelicans are large water birds with a distinctive pouch under their beak. As with other members of the order Pelecaniformes, they have webbed feet with four toes.

- Brown pelican, Pelecanus occidentalis

== Bitterns, herons and egrets ==
Order: Pelecaniformes Family: Ardeidae

The family Ardeidae contains the bitterns, herons and egrets. Herons and egrets are medium to large wading birds with long necks and legs. Bitterns tend to be shorter necked and more wary. Members of Ardeidae fly with their necks retracted, unlike other long-necked birds such as storks, ibises and spoonbills.

- Whistling heron, Syrigma sibilatrix (A)
- Great blue heron, Ardea herodias
- Great egret, Ardea alba
- Reddish egret, Egretta rufescens
- Tricoloured heron, Egretta tricolor
- Little blue heron, Egretta caerulea
- Snowy egret, Egretta thula
- Little egret, Egretta garzetta (A)
- Cattle egret, Bubulcus ibis
- Striated heron, Butorides striata
- Green heron, Butorides virescens
- Black-crowned night-heron, Nycticorax nycticorax
- Yellow-crowned night-heron, Nyctanassa violacea
- Boat-billed heron, Cochlearius cochlearius
- Pinnated bittern, Botaurus pinnatus

== Ibises and spoonbills ==
Order: Pelecaniformes Family: Threskiornithidae

Threskiornithidae is a family of large terrestrial and wading birds which includes the ibises and spoonbills. They have long, broad wings with 11 primary and about 20 secondary feathers. They are strong fliers and despite their size and weight, very capable soarers.

- American white ibis, Eudocimus albus
- Scarlet ibis, Eudocimus ruber
- Glossy ibis, Plegadis falcinellus
- White-faced ibis, Plegadis chihi
- Roseate spoonbill, Platalea ajaja

== Storks ==
Order: Ciconiiformes Family: Ciconiidae

Storks are large, long-legged, long-necked, wading birds with long, stout bills. Storks are mute, but bill-clattering is an important mode of communication at the nest. Their nests can be large and may be reused for many years. Many species are migratory.

- Wood stork, Mycteria americana

== Flamingos ==
Order: Phoenicopteriformes Family: Phoenicopteridae

Flamingos are gregarious wading birds, usually 3 to 5 feet (0.9 to 1.5 m) tall, found in both the Western and Eastern Hemispheres. Flamingos filter-feed on shellfish and algae. Their oddly shaped beaks are specially adapted to separate mud and silt from the food they consume and, uniquely, are used upside-down.

- Caribbean flamingo, Phoenicopterus ruber

== Ducks, geese and swans ==
Order: Anseriformes Family: Anatidae

Anatidae includes the ducks and most duck-like waterfowl, such as geese and swans. These birds are adapted to an aquatic existence with webbed feet, flattened bills, and feathers that are excellent at shedding water due to an oily coating.

- Fulvous whistling duck, Dendrocygna bicolor
- White-faced whistling duck, Dendrocygna viduata
- West Indian whistling duck, Dendrocygna arborea
- Black-bellied whistling duck, Dendrocygna autumnalis
- Greater white-fronted goose, Anser albifrons
- Comb duck, Sarkidiornis melanotos
- Wood duck, Aix sponsa (A)
- American wigeon, Anas americana
- Green-winged teal, Anas crecca
- Mallard, Anas platyrhynchos (A)
- Northern pintail, Anas acuta (A)
- White-cheeked pintail, Anas bahamensis
- Blue-winged teal, Anas discors
- Northern shoveler, Anas clypeata
- Ring-necked duck, Aythya collaris
- Lesser scaup, Aythya affinis
- Masked duck, Nomonyx dominica

== New World vultures ==
Order: Cathartiformes Family: Cathartidae

The New World vultures are not closely related to Old World vultures, but superficially resemble them because of convergent evolution. Like the Old World vultures, they are scavengers. However, unlike Old World vultures, which find carcasses by sight, New World vultures have a good sense of smell with which they locate carrion.

- Turkey vulture, Cathartes aura

== Osprey ==
Order: Accipitriformes Family: Pandionidae

The family Pandionidae contains only one species, the osprey. The osprey is a medium-large raptor which is a specialist fish-eater with a worldwide distribution.

- Osprey, Pandion haliaetus

== Hawks, kites and eagles ==
Order: Accipitriformes Family: Accipitridae

Accipitridae is a family of birds of prey, which includes hawks, eagles, kites, harriers and Old World vultures. These birds have powerful hooked beaks for tearing flesh from their prey, strong legs, powerful talons and keen eyesight.

- Swallow-tailed kite, Elanoides forficatus (A)
- White-tailed kite, Elanus leucurus
- Northern harrier, Circus cyaneus
- White-tailed hawk, Buteo albicaudatus
- Red-tailed hawk, Buteo jamaicensis

== Caracaras and falcons ==
Order: Falconiformes Family: Falconidae

Falconidae is a family of diurnal birds of prey. They differ from hawks, eagles and kites in that they kill with their beaks instead of their talons.

- Crested caracara, Caracara cheriway
- Yellow-headed caracara, Milvago chimachima
- American kestrel, Falco sparverius
- Merlin, Falco columbarius
- Peregrine falcon, Falco peregrinus

== New World quails ==
Order: Galliformes Family: Odontophoridae

The New World quails are small, plump terrestrial birds only distantly related to the quails of the Old World, but named for their similar appearance and habits.

- Crested bobwhite, Colinus cristatus

== Limpkins ==
Order: Gruiformes Family: Aramidae

The limpkin resembles a large rail. It has drab-brown plumage and a greyer head and neck.

- Limpkin, Aramus guarauna

== Rails, crakes, gallinules and coots ==
Order: Gruiformes Family: Rallidae

Rallidae is a large family of small to medium-sized birds which includes the rails, crakes, coots and gallinules. Typically they inhabit dense vegetation in damp environments near lakes, swamps or rivers. In general they are shy and secretive birds, making them difficult to observe. Most species have strong legs and long toes which are well adapted to soft uneven surfaces. They tend to have short, rounded wings and to be weak fliers.

- Sora, Porzana carolina
- Purple gallinule, Porphyrio martinicus
- Common gallinule, Gallinula galeata
- American coot, Fulica americana

== Jacanas ==
Order: Charadriiformes Family: Jacanidae

The jacanas are a group of tropical waders in the family Jacanidae. They are found throughout the tropics. They are identifiable by their huge feet and claws which enable them to walk on floating vegetation in the shallow lakes that are their preferred habitat.

- Wattled jacana, Jacana jacana

== Oystercatchers ==
Order: Charadriiformes Family: Haematopodidae

The oystercatchers are large and noisy plover-like birds, with strong bills used for smashing or prising open molluscs.

- American oystercatcher, Haematopus palliatus

== Avocets and stilts ==
Order: Charadriiformes Family: Recurvirostridae

Recurvirostridae is a family of large wading birds, which includes the avocets and stilts. The avocets have long legs and long up-curved bills. The stilts have extremely long legs and long, thin, straight bills.

- Black-necked stilt, Himantopus mexicanus
- American avocet, Recurvirostra americana

== Thick-knees ==
Order: Charadriiformes Family: Burhinidae

The thick-knees are a group of largely tropical waders in the family Burhinidae. They are found worldwide within the tropical zone, with some species also breeding in temperate Europe and Australia. They are medium to large waders with strong black or yellow-black bills, large yellow eyes and cryptic plumage. Despite being classed as waders, most species have a preference for arid or semi-arid habitats.

- Double-striped thick-knee, Burhinus bistriatus

== Plovers and lapwings ==
Order: Charadriiformes Family: Charadriidae

The family Charadriidae includes the plovers, dotterels and lapwings. They are small to medium-sized birds with compact bodies, short, thick necks and long, usually pointed, wings. They are found in open country worldwide, mostly in habitats near water.

- Southern lapwing, Vanellus chilensis
- American golden-plover, Pluvialis dominica
- Black-bellied plover, Pluvialis squatarola
- Semipalmated plover, Charadrius semipalmatus
- Wilson's plover, Charadrius wilsonia
- Killdeer, Charadrius vociferus
- Piping plover, Charadrius melodus
- Snowy plover, Charadrius nivosus
- Collared plover, Charadrius collaris

== Sandpipers and allies ==
Order: Charadriiformes Family: Scolopacidae

Scolopacidae is a large diverse family of small to medium-sized shorebirds including the sandpipers, curlews, godwits, shanks, tattlers, woodcocks, snipes, dowitchers and phalaropes. The majority of these species eat small invertebrates picked out of the mud or soil. Variation in length of legs and bills enables multiple species to feed in the same habitat, particularly on the coast, without direct competition for food.

- Wilson's snipe, Gallinago delicata
- Short-billed dowitcher, Limnodromus griseus
- Long-billed dowitcher, Limnodromus scolopaceus
- Hudsonian godwit, Limosa haemastica
- Whimbrel, Numenius phaeopus
- Upland sandpiper, Bartramia longicauda
- Greater yellowlegs, Tringa melanoleuca
- Lesser yellowlegs, Tringa flavipes
- Solitary sandpiper, Tringa solitaria
- Willet, Tringa semipalmata
- Spotted sandpiper, Actitis macularia
- Ruddy turnstone, Arenaria interpres
- Red knot, Calidris canutus
- Sanderling, Calidris alba
- Semipalmated sandpiper, Calidris pusilla
- Western sandpiper, Calidris mauri
- Least sandpiper, Calidris minutilla
- White-rumped sandpiper, Calidris fuscicollis
- Baird's sandpiper, Calidris bairdii
- Pectoral sandpiper, Calidris melanotos
- Dunlin, Calidris alpina (A)
- Stilt sandpiper, Calidris himantopus
- Buff-breasted sandpiper, Calidris subruficollis
- Wilson's phalarope, Phalaropus tricolor
- Red-necked phalarope, Phalaropus lobatus
- Red phalarope, Phalaropus fulicarius (A)

== Skuas and jaegers ==
Order: Charadriiformes Family: Stercorariidae

The family Stercorariidae are, in general, medium to large birds, typically with grey or brown plumage, often with white markings on the wings. They nest on the ground in temperate and arctic regions and are long-distance migrants.

- Great skua, Stercorarius skua
- Pomarine jaeger, Stercorarius pomarinus
- Parasitic jaeger, Stercorarius parasiticus

== Gulls, terns and skimmers ==
Order: Charadriiformes Family: Laridae

Laridae is a family of medium to large seabirds and includes gulls, kittiwakes, terns and skimmers. They are typically grey or white, often with black markings on the head or wings. They have longish bills and webbed feet. Terns are a group of generally medium to large seabirds typically with grey or white plumage, often with black markings on the head. Most terns hunt fish by diving but some pick insects off the surface of fresh water. Terns are generally long-lived birds, with several species known to live in excess of 30 years. Skimmers are a small family of tropical tern-like birds. They have an elongated lower mandible which they use to feed by flying low over the water surface and skimming the water for small fish.

- Ring-billed gull, Larus delawarensis
- Great black-backed gull, Larus marinus
- Lesser black-backed gull, Larus fuscus
- Herring gull, Larus argentatus
- Black-headed gull, Chroicocephalus ridibundus
- Bonaparte's gull, Chroicocephalus philadelphia
- Laughing gull, Leucophaeus atricilla
- Franklin's gull, Leucophaeus pipixcan
- Gull-billed tern, Gelochelidon nilotica
- Caspian tern, Hydroprogne caspia
- Sandwich tern, Thalasseus sandvicensis
- Royal tern, Thalasseus maxima
- Roseate tern, Sterna dougallii
- Common tern, Sterna hirundo
- Least tern, Sternula antillarum
- Bridled tern, Onychoprion anaethetus
- Sooty tern, Onychoprion fuscata
- Black tern, Chlidonias niger
- Large-billed tern, Phaetusa simplex
- Black noddy, Anous minutus
- Brown noddy, Anous stolidus
- Black skimmer, Rynchops niger

== Pigeons and doves ==
Order: Columbiformes Family: Columbidae

Pigeons and doves are stout-bodied birds with short necks and short slender bills with a fleshy cere.

- Rock dove, Columba livia (I)
- White-crowned pigeon, Patagioenas leucocephala (A)
- Scaly-naped pigeon, Patagioenas squamosa
- Bare-eyed pigeon, Patagioenas corensis
- Eared dove, Zenaida auriculata
- Zenaida dove, Zenaida aurita
- White-winged dove, Zenaida asiatica (A)
- Common ground-dove, Columbina passerina
- Ruddy ground dove, Columbina talpacoti
- White-tipped dove, Leptotila verreauxi
- Bridled quail-dove, Geotrygon mystacea

== Parrots, macaws and allies ==
Order: Psittaciformes Family: Psittacidae

Parrots are small to large birds with a characteristic curved beak. Their upper mandibles have slight mobility in the joint with the skull and they have a generally erect stance. All parrots are zygodactyl, having the four toes on each foot placed two at the front and two to the back.

- Brown-throated parakeet, Eupsittula pertinax
- Green-rumped parrotlet, Forpus passerinus
- White-crowned parrot, Pionus senilis (A)
- Yellow-shouldered amazon, Amazona barbadensis
- Orange-winged amazon, Amazona amazonica (I)

== Cuckoos and anis ==
Order: Cuculiformes Family: Cuculidae

The family Cuculidae includes cuckoos, roadrunners and anis. These birds are of variable size with slender bodies, long tails and strong legs. The Old World cuckoos are brood parasites.

- Yellow-billed cuckoo, Coccyzus americanus
- Mangrove cuckoo, Coccyzus minor
- Grey-capped cuckoo, Coccyzus lansbergi
- Smooth-billed ani, Crotophaga ani (A)
- Groove-billed ani, Crotophaga sulcirostris
- Guira cuckoo, Guira guira

== Barn owls ==
Order: Strigiformes Family: Tytonidae

Barn-owls are medium to large owls with large heads and characteristic heart-shaped faces. They have long strong legs with powerful talons.

- American barn owl, Tyto furcata

== Typical owls ==
Order: Strigiformes Family: Strigidae

The typical owls are small to large solitary nocturnal birds of prey. They have large forward-facing eyes and ears, a hawk-like beak and a conspicuous circle of feathers around each eye called a facial disk.

- Burrowing owl, Athene cunicularia

== Oilbird ==
Order: Caprimulgiformes Family: Steatornithidae

The oilbird is a slim, long-winged bird related to the nightjars. It is nocturnal and a specialist feeder on the fruit of the oil palm.

- Oilbird, Steatornis caripensis

== Nightjars ==
Order: Caprimulgiformes Family: Caprimulgidae

Nightjars are medium-sized nocturnal birds that usually nest on the ground. They have long wings, short legs and very short bills. Most have small feet, of little use for walking, and long pointed wings. Their soft plumage is camouflaged to resemble bark or leaves.

- Lesser nighthawk, Chordeiles acutipennis
- Common nighthawk, Chordeiles minor
- Antillean nighthawk, Chordeiles gundlachii
- Chuck-will's-widow, Antrostomus carolinensis
- White-tailed nightjar, Hydropsalis cayennensis

== Swifts ==
Order: Apodiformes Family: Apodidae

Swifts are small birds which spend the majority of their lives flying. These birds have very short legs and never settle voluntarily on the ground, perching instead only on vertical surfaces. Many swifts have long swept-back wings which resemble a crescent or boomerang.

- White-collared swift, Streptoprocne zonaris
- Chimney swift, Chaetura pelagica

== Hummingbirds ==
Order: Trochiliformes Family: Trochilidae

Hummingbirds are small birds capable of hovering in mid-air due to the rapid flapping of their wings. They are the only birds that can fly backwards.

- Rufous-breasted hermit, Glaucis hirsuta
- White-necked jacobin, Florisuga mellivora
- Purple-throated carib, Eulampis jugularis
- Green-throated carib, Eulampis holosericeus
- Ruby-topaz hummingbird, Chrysolampis mosquitus
- Antillean crested hummingbird, Orthorhyncus cristatus
- Blue-tailed emerald, Chlorostilbon mellisugus
- Copper-rumped hummingbird, Saucerottia tobaci

== Kingfishers ==
Order: Coraciiformes Family: Alcedinidae

Kingfishers are medium-sized birds with large heads, long, pointed bills, short legs and stubby tails.

- Belted kingfisher, Megaceryle alcyon
- Amazon kingfisher, Chloroceryle amazona

== Woodpeckers and allies ==
Order: Piciformes Family: Picidae

Woodpeckers are small to medium-sized birds with chisel-like beaks, short legs, stiff tails and long tongues used for capturing insects. Some species have feet with two toes pointing forward and two backward, while several species have only three toes. Many woodpeckers have the habit of tapping noisily on tree trunks with their beaks.

- Yellow-bellied sapsucker, Sphyrapicus varius

== Ovenbirds ==
Order: Passeriformes Family: Furnariidae

Ovenbirds comprise a large family of small sub-oscine passerine bird species found in Central and South America. They are a diverse group of insectivores which gets its name from the elaborate "oven-like" clay nests built by some species, although others build stick nests or nest in tunnels or clefts in rock.

- Scaly-throated leaftosser, Sclerurus guatemalensis (A)

== Woodcreepers ==
Order: Passeriformes Family: Dendrocolaptidae

The Dendrocolaptidae are brownish birds which maintain an upright vertical posture, supported by their stiff tail vanes. They feed mainly on insects taken from tree trunks.

- Olivaceous woodcreeper, Sittasomus griseicapillus (A)

== Tyrant flycatchers ==
Order: Passeriformes Family: Tyrannidae

Tyrant flycatchers are passerine birds which occur throughout North and South America. They superficially resemble the Old World flycatchers, but are more robust and have stronger bills. They do not have the sophisticated vocal capabilities of the songbirds. Most, but not all, have plain colouring. As the name implies, most are insectivorous.

- Caribbean elaenia, Elaenia martinica
- Small-billed elaenia, Elaenia parvirostris
- Lesser elaenia, Elaenia chiriquensis
- Northern scrub-flycatcher, Sublegatus arenarum
- Olive-sided flycatcher, Contopus cooperi
- Eastern wood-pewee, Contopus virens
- Vermilion flycatcher, Pyrocephalus rubinus
- Brown-crested flycatcher, Myiarchus tyrannulus
- Tropical kingbird, Tyrannus melancholicus
- Eastern kingbird, Tyrannus tyrannus
- Grey kingbird, Tyrannus dominicensis
- Fork-tailed flycatcher, Tyrannus savana

== Swallows and martins ==
Order: Passeriformes Family: Hirundinidae

The family Hirundinidae is adapted to aerial feeding. They have a slender streamlined body, long pointed wings and a short bill with a wide gape. The feet are adapted to perching rather than walking, and the front toes are partially joined at the base.

- Purple martin, Progne subis
- Cuban martin, Progne cryptoleuca
- Caribbean martin, Progne dominicensis
- White-winged swallow, Tachycineta albiventer
- Chilean swallow, Tachycineta meyeni
- Northern rough-winged swallow, Stelgidopteryx serripennis
- Bank swallow, Riparia riparia
- Cliff swallow, Petrochelidon pyrrhonota
- Cave swallow, Petrochelidon fulva
- Barn swallow, Hirundo rustica

== Waxwings ==
Order: Passeriformes Family: Bombycillidae

The waxwings are a group of birds with soft silky plumage and unique red tips to some of the wing feathers. In the Bohemian and cedar waxwings, these tips look like sealing wax and give the group its name. These are arboreal birds of northern forests. They live on insects in summer and berries in winter.

- Cedar waxwing, Bombycilla cedrorum

== Wrens ==
Order: Passeriformes Family: Troglodytidae

The wrens are mainly small and inconspicuous except for their loud songs. These birds have short wings and thin down-turned bills. Several species often hold their tails upright. All are insectivorous.

- House wren, Troglodytes aedon

== Mockingbirds and thrashers ==
Order: Passeriformes Family: Mimidae

The mimids are a family of passerine birds that includes thrashers, mockingbirds, tremblers and the New World catbirds. These birds are notable for their vocalizations, especially their ability to mimic a wide variety of birds and other sounds heard outdoors. Their colouring tends towards dull-greys and browns.

- Tropical mockingbird, Mimus gilvus
- Brown thrasher, Toxostoma rufum (A)
- Brown trembler, Cinclocerthia ruficauda
- Scaly-breasted thrasher, Allenia fusca
- Pearly-eyed thrasher, Margarops fuscatus

== Thrushes and allies ==
Order: Passeriformes Family: Turdidae

The thrushes are a group of passerine birds that occur mainly in the Old World. They are plump, soft plumaged, small to medium-sized insectivores or sometimes omnivores, often feeding on the ground. Many have attractive songs.

- Veery, Catharus fuscescens
- Grey-cheeked thrush, Catharus minimus
- Swainson's thrush, Catharus ustulatus
- Wood thrush, Hylocichla mustelina

== Old World flycatchers ==
Order: Passeriformes Family: Muscicapidae

Old World flycatchers are a large group of small passerine birds native to the Old World. They are mainly small arboreal insectivores. The appearance of these birds is highly varied, but they mostly have weak songs and harsh calls.

- Northern wheatear, Oenanthe oenanthe

== Starlings ==
Order: Passeriformes Family: Sturnidae

Starlings are small to medium-sized passerine birds. Their flight is strong and direct and they are very gregarious. Their preferred habitat is fairly open country. They eat insects and fruit. Plumage is typically dark with a metallic sheen.

- European starling, Sturnus vulgaris (I)

== Weavers and allies ==
Order: Passeriformes Family: Ploceidae

The weavers are small passerine birds related to the finches. They are seed-eating birds with rounded conical bills. The males of many species are brightly coloured, usually in red or yellow and black, some species show variation in colour only in the breeding season.

- Village weaver, Ploceus cucullatus (I)

== Vireos ==
Order: Passeriformes Family: Vireonidae

The vireos are a group of small to medium-sized passerine birds restricted to the New World. They are typically greenish in colour and resemble wood warblers apart from their heavier bills.

- Yellow-throated vireo, Vireo flavifrons
- Philadelphia vireo, Vireo philadelphicus (A)
- Red-eyed vireo, Vireo olivaceus
- Black-whiskered vireo, Vireo altiloquus

== New World warblers ==
Order: Passeriformes Family: Parulidae

The New World warblers are a group of small, often colourful, passerine birds restricted to the New World. Most are arboreal, but some are terrestrial. Most members of this family are insectivores.

- Golden-winged warbler, Vermivora chrysoptera (A)
- Tennessee warbler, Oreothlypis peregrina
- Northern parula, Setophaga americana
- Yellow warbler, Setophaga petechia
- Chestnut-sided warbler, Setophaga pensylvanica
- Magnolia warbler, Setophaga magnolia (A)
- Cape May warbler, Setophaga tigrina
- Black-throated blue warbler, Setophaga caerulescens
- Yellow-rumped warbler, Setophaga coronata
- Black-throated green warbler, Setophaga virens
- Blackburnian warbler, Setophaga fusca
- Prairie warbler, Setophaga discolor
- Palm warbler, Setophaga palmarum
- Bay-breasted warbler, Setophaga castanea
- Blackpoll warbler, Setophaga striata
- Cerulean warbler, Setophaga cerulea
- Hooded warbler, Setophaga citrina
- American redstart, Setophaga ruticilla
- Black-and-white warbler, Mniotilta varia
- Prothonotary warbler, Protonotaria citrea
- Worm-eating warbler, Helmitheros vermivorus
- Ovenbird, Seiurus aurocapilla
- Northern waterthrush, Parkesia noveboracensis
- Louisiana waterthrush, Parkesia motacilla
- Connecticut warbler, Oporornis agilis
- Kentucky warbler, Geothlypis formosa
- Mourning warbler, Geothlypis philadelphia
- Common yellowthroat, Geothlypis trichas
- Canada warbler, Cardellina canadensis

== Tanagers ==
Order: Passeriformes Family: Thraupidae

The tanagers are a large group of small to medium-sized passerine birds restricted to the New World, mainly in the tropics. Many species are brightly coloured. They are seed eaters, but their preference tends towards fruit and nectar.

- Golden-hooded tanager, Tangara larvata
- Masked tanager, Tangara nigrocincta
- Red-legged honeycreeper, Cyanerpes cyaneus
- Bananaquit, Coereba flaveola

== Buntings, sparrows, seedeaters and allies ==
Order: Passeriformes Family: Emberizidae

The emberizids are a large family of passerine birds. They are seed-eating birds with distinctively shaped bills. In Europe, most species are called buntings. In North America, most of the species in this family are known as sparrows, but these birds are not closely related to the Old World sparrows which are in the family Passeridae. Many emberizid species have distinctive head patterns.

- Blue-black grassquit, Volatinia jacarina
- Black-faced grassquit, Tiaris bicolor
- Lesser Antillean bullfinch, Loxigilla noctis
- Saffron finch, Sicalis flaveola
- Grasshopper sparrow, Ammodramus savannarum
- White-throated sparrow, Zonotrichia albicollis
- Rufous-collared sparrow, Zonotrichia capensis

== Cardinals and allies ==
Order: Passeriformes Family: Cardinalidae

The cardinals are a family of robust, seed-eating birds with strong bills. They are typically associated with open woodland. The sexes usually have distinct plumages.

- Scarlet tanager, Piranga olivacea
- Summer tanager, Piranga rubra
- Western tanager, Piranga ludoviciana (A)
- Rose-breasted grosbeak, Pheucticus ludovicianus
- Black-headed grosbeak, Pheucticus melanocephalus
- Blue-black grosbeak, Cyanocompsa cyanoides (A)
- Blue grosbeak, Passerina caerulea (A)
- Indigo bunting, Passerina cyanea
- Dickcissel, Spiza americana

== Siskins, crossbills and allies ==
Order: Passeriformes Family: Fringillidae

Finches are seed-eating passerine birds, that are small to moderately large and have a strong beak, usually conical and in some species very large. All have twelve tail feathers and nine primaries. These birds have a bouncing flight with alternating bouts of flapping and gliding on closed wings, and most sing well.

- Antillean euphonia, Euphonia musica

== Troupials and allies ==
Order: Passeriformes Family: Icteridae

The icterids are a group of small to medium-sized, often colourful, passerine birds restricted to the New World and include the grackles, New World blackbirds and New World orioles. Most species have black as the predominant plumage colour, often enlivened by yellow, orange or red.

- Bobolink, Dolichonyx oryzivorus
- Yellow-hooded blackbird, Chrysomus icterocephalus
- Red-breasted meadowlark, Sturnella militaris (A)
- Eastern meadowlark, Sturnella magna
- Carib grackle, Quiscalus lugubris
- Shiny cowbird, Molothrus bonariensis
- South American yellow oriole, Icterus nigrogularis
- Venezuelan troupial, Icterus icterus
- Baltimore oriole, Icterus galbula

== Sparrows ==
Order: Passeriformes Family: Passeridae

Sparrows are small passerine birds. In general, sparrows tend to be small, plump, brown or grey birds with short tails and short powerful beaks. Sparrows are seed eaters, but they also consume small insects.

- House sparrow, Passer domesticus (I)

== See also ==
- List of birds
- Lists of birds by region
