= Communications in the Dutch Caribbean =

There are communications (including transport) in the Dutch Caribbean.

The Caribbean part of the Kingdom of the Netherlands is made of 6 islands: the dependent countries of Aruba, Curaçao and Sint Maarten, and the special municipalities of Bonaire, Sint Eustatius and Saba. From 1954 to 2010, it constituted the dependent country of the Netherlands Antilles, from which Aruba split in 1986.

== Roads ==
All driving was on the right.

Highways (1992 est.)
Type	Length	
total	600 km	370 mi
paved	300 km	190 mi
unpaved	300 km	190 mi

== Sea ==
=== Ports and harbours ===
Barcadera, Oranjestad, and San Nicolaas (Aruba), Fort Bay (Saba), Kralendijk (Bonaire), Philipsburg (Sint Maarten), Willemstad (Curaçao).

There was a Curaçaon Dock Company.

=== Merchant marine ===
total
110 ships (1,000 GT or over) totaling 1,028,910 GT/1,285,837 tonnes deadweight (DWT)
ships by type
bulk 2, cargo 27, chemical tanker 2, combination ore/oil 3, container 16, liquified gas 4, multi-functional large load carrier 18, passenger 1, petroleum tanker 5, refrigerated cargo 26, roll-on/roll-off 6 (1999 est.)
note
a flag of convenience registry; includes ships of 2 countries: Belgium owns 9 ships, Germany 1 (1998 est.)

== Public transport ==
There are buses and taxis.

== Broadcasting ==
There was radio and television broadcasting, channels included Telecuraçao.
