= Football in the Netherlands Antilles =

The sport of football in the Netherlands Antilles was run by the Nederlands Antilliaanse Voetbal Unie. The association administers the national football team, as well as the Netherlands Antilles Championship.

The Netherlands Antilles team were mildly successful, finishing third in the CONCACAF Championship in 1963 and 1969.
