= List of cities in the Dutch Caribbean =

List of cities of each of the islands in the Dutch Caribbean.

The Caribbean part of the Kingdom of the Netherlands is made of 6 islands: the dependent countries of Aruba, Curaçao and Sint Maarten, and the special municipalities of Bonaire, Sint Eustatius and Saba. From 1954 to 2010, it constituted the dependent country of the Netherlands Antilles, from which Aruba split in 1986.

== Island of Aruba ==
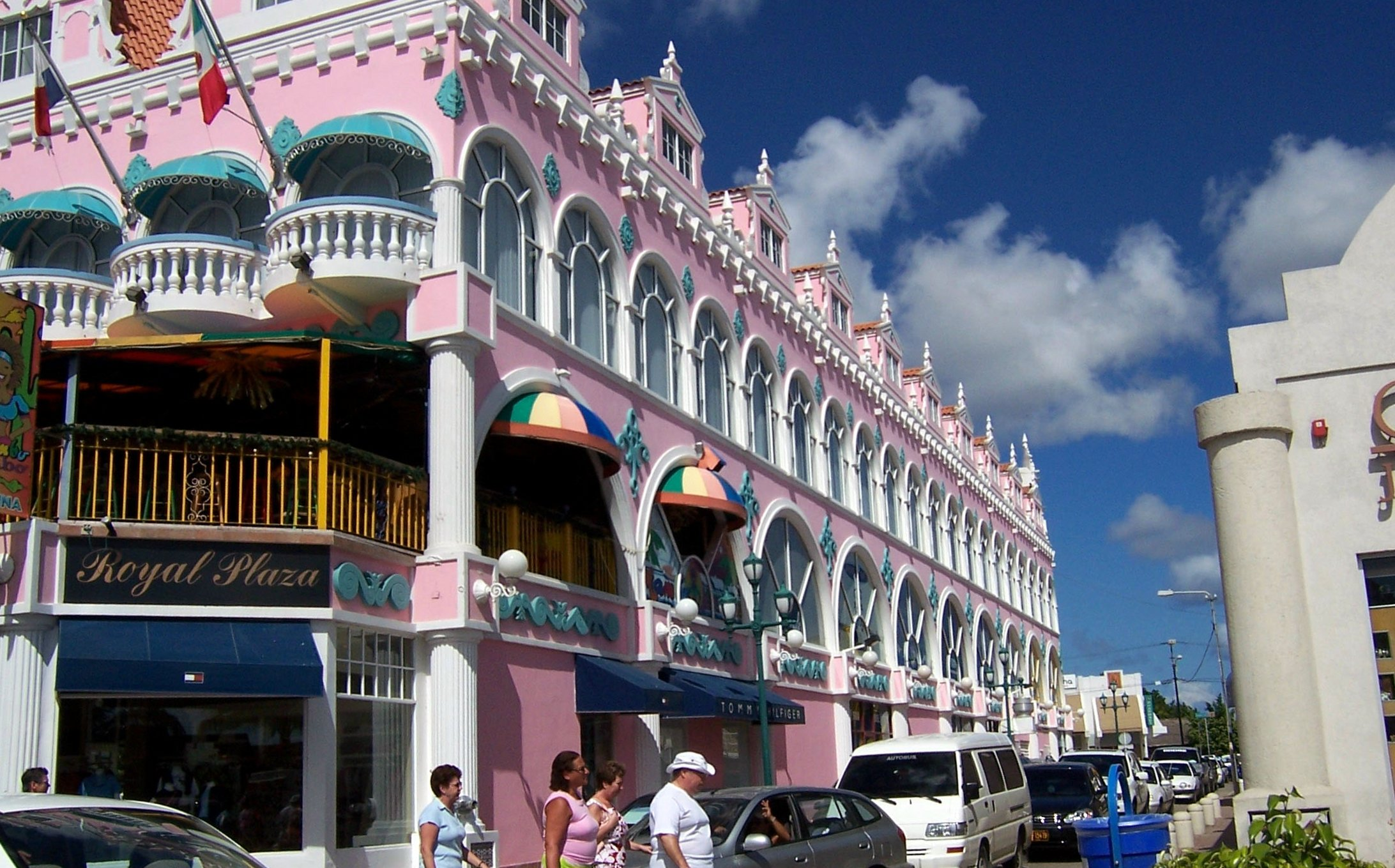
Oranjestad

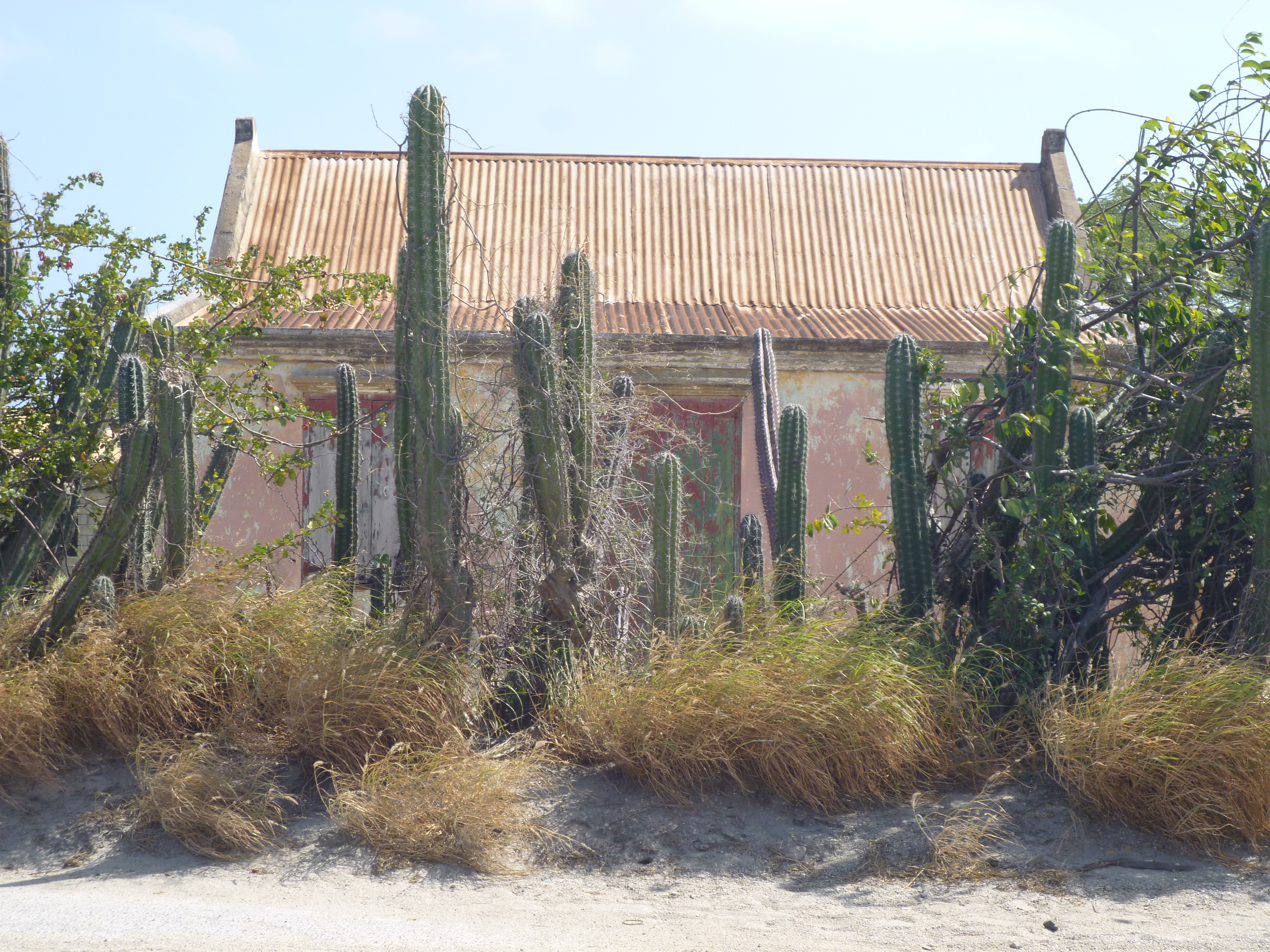
Savaneta

- Oranjestad*
- Noord
- San Nicolaas
- Santa Cruz
- Savaneta
- Palm Beach
- Paradera
- Lago Colony

== Island of Bonaire ==
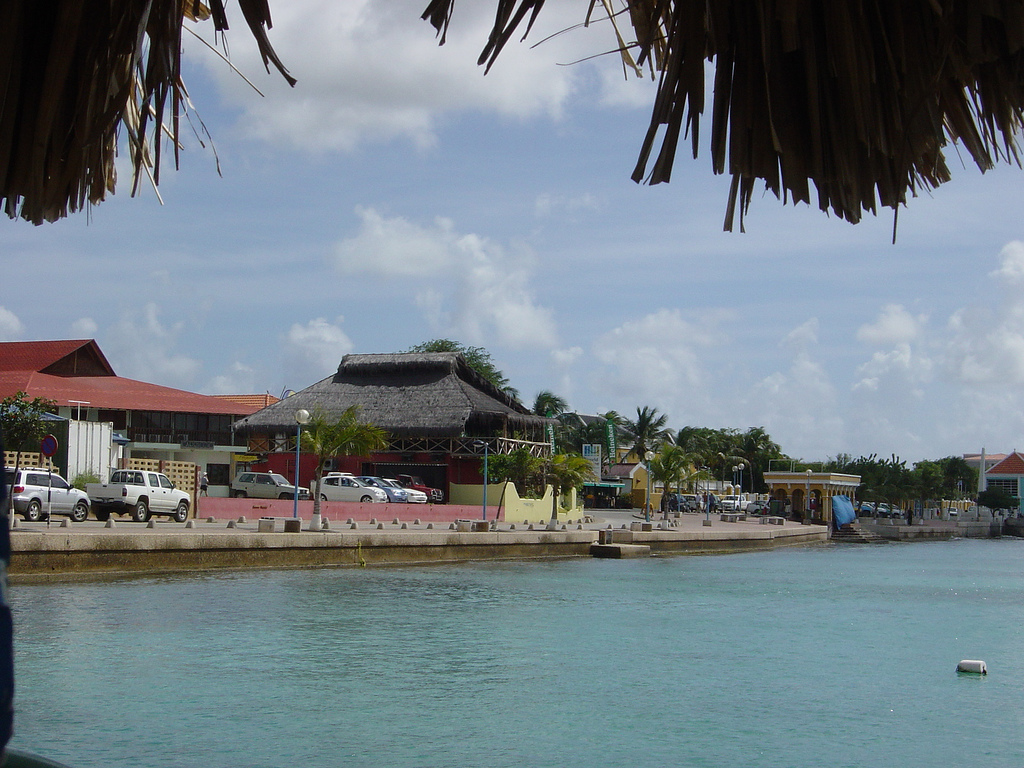
Kralendijk

- Kralendijk*
- Rincón
- Antriol

== Island of Curaçao ==
- Barber
- Lagún
- Santa Rosa
- Spaanse Water
- Tera Corá
- Willemstad*

== Island of Saba ==
- The Bottom*

== Island of Sint Eustatius (Statia) ==
- Oranjestad*

== Island of Sint Maarten ==
- Philipsburg*
- Lower Prince's Quarter
- Cul de Sac
- Cole Bay
- Upper Prince's Quarter
- Little Bay
- Simpson Bay
- Lowlands

* Capital of respective island.
