= List of streams of the Dutch Caribbean =

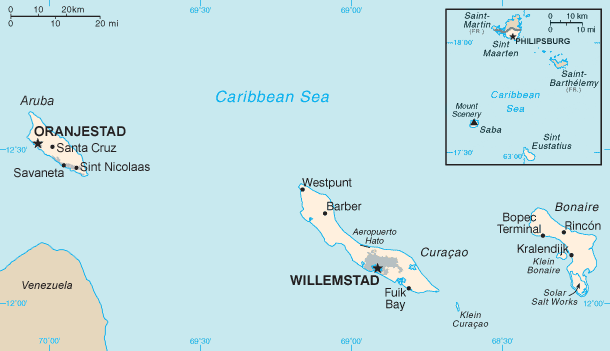
Map of the Dutch Caribbean

There are no rivers in the Dutch Caribbean. This is a list of streams of the Dutch Caribbean. Except for Aruba, the streams (rooi or roi) of the other islands are listed in clockwise order, starting at the north end of each island.

== Aruba ==
The following streams are located in Aruba:

- Rooi Afo, 12°31′19″N 70°01′16″W
- Rooi Awa Marga, 12°32′04″N 69°57′29″W
- Rooi Bosal, 12°28′40″N 69°59′10″W
- Rooi Cochi, 12°26′48″N 69°56′16″W
- Rooi Congo, 12°26′39″N 69°54′52″W
- Rooi Dwars, 12°29′22″N 69°54′57″W
- Rooi Fluit, 12°31′33″N 69°56′05″W
- Rooi Frances, 12°28′57″N 69°58′19″W
- Rooi Hundu, 12°26′18″N 69°54′08″W
- Rooi Lamunchi, 12°27′30″N 69°57′29″W
- Rooi Manonchi, 12°30′56″N 70°02′06″W
- Rooi Master, 12°26′27″N 69°55′29″W
- Rooi Prikichi, 12°32′43″N 69°58′55″W
- Rooi Prins, 12°29′44″N 69°54′33″W
- Rooi Santo, 12°35′06″N 70°02′31″W
- Rooi Spoki, 12°26′30″N 69°54′12″W
- Rooi Taki, 12°28′48″N 69°58′12″W
- Rooi Tambú, 12°30′17″N 69°55′13″W
- Rooi Thomas, 12°29′38″N 69°54′12″W

== Caribbean Netherlands ==
The Caribbean Netherlands are the three special municipalities of the Netherlands that are located in the Caribbean Sea.

=== Bonaire ===
The following streams are in Bonaire. All are intermittent streams, except Roi Kaohari.

- Rooi Grandi, 12°16′00″N 68°18′00″W
- Roi Kaohari, 12°12′40″N 68°12′41″W
- Rooi Tuna, 12°11′45″N 68°13′07″W
- Rooi Promente, 12°10′56″N 68°13′29″W
- Rooi Huba, 12°14′49″N 68°22′24″W
- Camia, 12°18′00″N 68°23′00″W

=== Sint Eustatius ===
The following streams are in Sint Eustatius:

- Wash Gut, 17°30′31″N 62°59′12″W
- Smith Gut, 17°30′10″N 62°58′36″W
- Soldiers Gut, 17°28′04″N 62°57′21″W
- Claes Gut, 17°28′00″N 62°59′00″W
- Billy's Gut, 17°29′15″N 62°59′39″W
- Big Gut, 17°27′54″N 62°57′47″W
- Toby's Gut, 17°27′54″N 62°58′05″W
- Spouts, 17°30′26″N 62°58′52″W

=== Saba ===
The following streams are in Saba:

- Island Gut, 17°38′31″N 63°14′08″W
- Spring Bay Gut, 17°38′16″N 63°13′18″W
- Cove Gut, 17°38′36″N 63°13′18″W
- Core Gut, 17°37′50″N 63°13′08″W
- Middle Island Gut, 17°38′09″N 63°15′15″W
- Ladder Gut, 17°37′59″N 63°15′16″W
- Well's Gut, 17°38′20″N 63°15′08″W
- Great Savannah Gut, 17°37′01″N 63°13′56″W
- Deep Gut, 17°38′49″N 63°13′57″W
- Compagnie's Gut, 17°36′53″N 63°14′23″W
- Wash Gut, 17°37′04″N 63°13′52″W
- Tom's Gut, 17°36′54″N 63°14′09″W
- Bannana Gut, 17°37′21″N 63°13′53″W
- Smoky Gut, 17°38′41″N 63°15′02″W
- Plump Gut, 17°37′54″N 63°13′32″W

== Curaçao ==
The following intermittent streams are located in Curaçao:

- Roi Salga, 12°22′00″N 69°07′00″W
- Roi Beru, 12°21′N 69°06′W
- Roi Hundu, 12°05′00″N 68°47′00″W
- Roi Clement, 12°05′00″N 68°47′00″W
- Roi Kosta, 12°04′00″N 68°45′00″W
- Roi Shon Tata, 12°02′00″N 68°47′00″W
- Roi Katoen, 12°12′00″N 69°02′00″W
- Roi Dòmi, 12°18′00″N 69°08′00″W
- Roi Dam Guera, 12°21′00″N 69°08′00″W

== Sint Maarten ==
The following intermittent streams are located in Sint Maarten:

- Ravine Rouge, 18°02′54″N 63°00′59″W
- Zagersgut, 18°02′05″N 63°03′34″W

== See also ==
- List of rivers of the Americas
- List of rivers of the Americas by coastline
