= Constitution of the Netherlands Antilles =

The Constitution of the Netherlands Antilles (Dutch: Staatsregeling van de Nederlandse Antillen) was the foundational document of the government of the Netherland Antilles and was proclaimed on 29 March 1955 by Order-in-Council for the Kingdom. Its proclamation was specifically mandated by article 59(4) of the Charter for the Kingdom of the Netherlands, which established the Netherlands Antilles, and had been signed by Queen Juliana on 15 December 1954. The Constitution along with the Island Regulation of the Netherlands Antilles (Dutch: Eilandenregeling Nederlandse Antillen or ERNA), described the foundation of the government, both remaining in effect until the dissolution of the Netherlands Antilles on 10 October 2010.

== Provisions for Government ==
The region was still part of the Kingdom of the Netherlands and hence did not have autonomy over certain issues including defence, foreign policy, citizenship and extradition. However, like European Netherlands and Suriname (also established by the Charter of 1954) it was autonomous over internal affairs and the three were constitutionally equal constituent countries of the Kingdom of the Netherlands until Suriname's independence in 1975. After which the Netherlands Antilles was the only other constituent country alongside the European Netherlands until 1986.

The region had a federal government under which state governments operated, as described by the constitution, although the constitution never uses the word federal. It established a government of three parts: the Governor of the Netherlands Antilles, representing the Monarch of the Netherlands; a Council of Ministers; and a Parliament of 22 elected members for 4 years terms.

== End of the Constitution ==
The Netherlands Antilles originally consisted of six islands: Aruba, Bonaire, Curaçao, Saba, St. Eustatius and St. Maarten. Aruba, which had a long running secession movement, left the Netherlands Antilles in 1986 to become a separate constituent country within the Kingdom of the Netherlands.

The Aruban secession led to calls for a similar arrangement in the rest of the Netherlands Antilles. After referendums were held on the remaining five islands between 2000 and 2005, they began the process of changing their constitutional status. Bonaire, Saba and St. Eustatius voted to establish direct ties to the Netherlands as gemeentes or "municipalities", becoming integral parts of the country of the Netherlands termed the Caribbean Netherlands. However, Curaçao and St. Maarten voted for a separate status as full constituent countries, as was already enjoyed by Aruba since 1986.

The dissolution of the Netherlands Antilles became effective on October 10, 2010, with all six islands remained under the Kingdom of the Netherlands termed the Dutch Caribbean. After this the Constitution became defunct and was superseded by the Constitution of the Netherlands in Bonaire, Saba and St. Eustatius, and the new constitutions of Curaçao and St. Maarten in the new constituent countries.
