= List of football clubs in the former Netherlands Antilles =

Football clubs in the former Netherlands Antilles include:

- C.S.D. Barber (CUR)
- UNDEBA (CUR)
- SV Juventus (BON)
- Real Rincon (BON)
