= Demographics of the Netherlands Antilles =

Demographic features of the population of the former Netherlands Antilles include population density, ethnicity, education level, health of the populace, economic status, religious affiliations and other aspects.

== Population of the Islands ==
According to the official estimates of the Central Bureau of Statistics of the Netherlands Antilles, the five islands had a combined population of 211,871 as at 1 January 2013. The population of the individual islands was as follows:

- Bonaire - 17,408
- Curaçao - 154,843
- Saba - 1,991
- Sint Eustatius - 4,020
- Sint Maarten - 33,609

For comparison: Aruba - 103,400

== CIA World Factbook demographic statistics ==
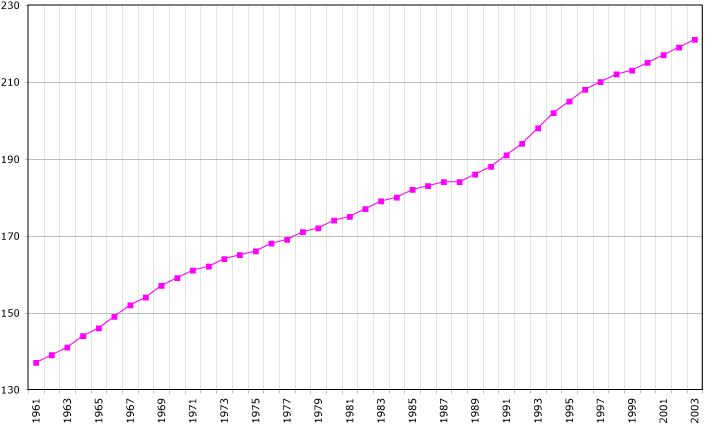
Population of the Netherlands Antilles in thousands, 1961–2003.

The following demographic statistics are from the CIA World Factbook, unless otherwise indicated. The capital and largest city was Willemstad.

Age structure:

- 0–14 years: 23,9% (male 27 197; female 25 886)
- 15–64 years: 67.3% (male 71 622; female 77 710)
- 65 years and over: 8.7% (male 7 925; female 11 396) (2006 est.)

Population growth rate: 0,79% (2006 est.)

Birth rate: 14,78 births/1,000 population (2006 est.)

Death rate: 6,45 deaths/1,000 population (2006 est.)

Net migration rate: -0.4 migrant(s)/1,000 population (2006 est.)

Human sex ratio:

- at birth: 1,05 male(s)/female
- under 15 years: 1,05 male(s)/female
- 15–64 years: 0,92 male(s)/female
- 65 years and over: 0,7 male(s)/female
- total population: 0,93 male(s)/female (2006 est.)

Infant mortality rate: 9,76 deaths/1,000 live births (2006 est.)

Life expectancy at birth:

- total population: 76,03 years
- male: 73,76 years
- female: 78,41 years (2006 est.)

Total fertility rate: 1.98 children born/woman (2008 est.)

Nationality:

- by law: Dutch (Nederlandse)
- noun: Netherlands Antillean(s)
- adjective: Netherlands Antillean

Ethnic groups: mixed black 85%, Carib Amerindian, white, East Asian 15%

Religions: Roman Catholic 72%, Pentecostal 4,9%, Protestant 3.5%, Seventh-day Adventist 3,1%, Methodist 2,9%, other Christian 4,2%, Jehovah's Witnesses 1,7%, Jewish 1,3%

Languages: Dutch, English and Papiamento are official languages. Papiamento (a Portuguese-West African creole with Dutch and Spanish influence) predominates on Curaçao and Bonaire, while English is widely spoken. English is the most commonly spoken language on Sint Maarten, Saba, and Sint Eustatius.

Literacy:

- definition: age 15 and over can read and write
- total population: 96,7%
- male: 96,7%
- female: 96,8% (2003 est.)
