= Islands Regulation of the Netherlands Antilles =

The Islands Regulation of the Netherlands Antilles (Dutch: Eilandenregeling Nederlandse Antillen, ERNA; Papiamento: Regulashon Insular delas Antias Hulandes, RIAH) described the autonomy of the island territories of the Netherlands Antilles. It was enacted on 3 March 1951 by royal decree and remained in force, in a consolidated form, until the dissolution of the Netherlands Antilles on 10 October 2010.

Together with the Constitution of the Netherlands Antilles, the Islands Regulation described the foundation of the government of the Netherlands Antilles. The fact that the Constitution depended on the Islands Regulation led many scholars to regard the Netherlands Antilles as a federal arrangement.
