= List of universities in the Dutch Caribbean =

This is a list of universities in the Dutch Caribbean (comprising the constituent countries of Curaçao, Aruba and Sint Maarten (the 'CAS' islands) as well as the special municipalities of Bonaire, Sint Eustatius and Saba (the 'BES' islands).

- Dr. Moises Frumencio da Costa Gomez University of Curaçao, Curaçao
- Avalon University School of Medicine (AUSOM), Curaçao
- American University of the Caribbean, Sint Maarten
- Caribbean Medical University, Curaçao
- Saba University School of Medicine, Saba
- Saint James School of Medicine, Bonaire
- Bloomington University, Curaçao
- University of St. Martin, Sint Maarten
- The University of America, Curaçao
- Topland University, Curaçao
- University of Sint Eustatius School of Medicine
- High Fliers University of America, Curaçao
- Hope International Business School, Curaçao
- The Euler-Franeker Memorial University, Curaçao
- Western State University, Curaçao

== Government licensed accreditation agencies in Curaçao ==
Curaçao became a constituent country of the Kingdom of the Netherlands on 10 October 2010. It has its own Central Bank, Ministry of Education, Ministry of Economics, Ministry of Health and Ministry of Justice.

The Curaçao Transnational Accreditation Council (CTAC.BV) was licensed by the Curaçao government to accredit all Transnational Education (TNE) Institutions chartered by the Ministry of Education and Ministry Health Curaçao, whether these institutions are in or outside Curaçao. Curaçao Transnational Education Institutions, which receive establishing charters from the Ministry of Education, are directly under the management and control of the Ministry of Economics Development. Hence, the Curaçao Transnational Accreditation Council is licensed by the Curaçao Government through the Ministry of Economics Development to perform a curricula programmatic accreditation for all Curaçao TNE institutions outside the Curaçao national higher educational System.

"Accreditation Agency Curaçao B.V." (AAC), another private accreditation agency licensed by Curaçao government was established in Curaçao. On 16 May 2022, it was acknowledged by the Ministry of Education, Science, Culture and Sport of Curaçao as the national accreditation body for higher education. However, the legislative process to formalize this framework was not adopted by the Parliament of Curaçao and was not ratified by national decree. As a result, AAC is authorized by the Ministry, but not designated by law as the national accrediting body under Article 17 of the draft Higher Education Ordinance.

Constituent countries of the Kingdom of the Netherlands such as Curaçao and Sint Maarten do not impose statutory restrictions on the recognition of accreditation, provided that the accrediting entity is acknowledged as an international quality assurance body. An example of this policy is the agreement signed between the Government of Curaçao and the Independent Agency for the Accreditation of Educational Programs and Organizations (AAEPO), Kyrgyz Republic, to enhance education standards in the region. In May 2023, the government of Curaçao and the AAEPO signed an agreement to enhance education standards.
