= Politics of the Netherlands Antilles =

Political system of the Netherlands Antilles

The politics of the Netherlands Antilles, a former constituent country of the Kingdom of the Netherlands, existed in a framework of a parliamentary representative democratic country, in which the prime minister was the head of government, and of a multi-party system. Executive power was exercised by the government. Federal legislative power was vested in both the government and parliament. The Judiciary was independent of the executive and the legislature. The Netherlands Antilles had full autonomy on most matters. Exceptions were defence, foreign affairs, and the Supreme Court.

Executive power rested with a governor, and a prime minister headed an eight-member Cabinet. The governor was appointed for a six-year term by the monarch, and the prime minister and deputy prime minister were elected by the Staten for four-year terms. The legislature or Staten elected by direct, popular vote to serve four-year terms.

The judicial system, which had mainly been derived from the Dutch system, operated independently of the legislature and the executive. Jurisdiction, including appeal, lied with the Common Court of Justice of the Netherlands Antilles and Aruba and the Supreme Court of Justice in the Netherlands.

The Netherlands Antilles were disbanded on 10 October 2010.

== Executive branch ==
Main office holders
Office	Name	Party	Since	Until
Monarch	Beatrix		30 April 1980	10 October 2010
Governor	Frits Goedgedrag		1 July 2002	10 October 2010
Prime Minister	Emily de Jongh-Elhage	PAR	26 March 2006	10 October 2010

The Governor was appointed by the monarch for a six-year term.
The Council of Ministers was elected by the Staten.

== Legislative branch ==
Unicameral Estates of the Netherlands Antilles (22 seats; members were elected by popular vote to serve four-year terms)

== Political parties and elections ==
Political parties were indigenous to each island.

== Judicial branch ==
Joint High Court of Justice, judges appointed by the monarch

== Administrative divisions ==
The Antilles were divided into five insular territories: Curaçao, Bonaire, Sint Maarten, Saba, Sint Eustatius. On 10 October 2010 the Netherlands Antilles were disbanded.

== International organization participation ==
Caricom (observer), ECLAC (associate), Interpol, IOC, UNESCO (associate), UPU, WMO, WToO (associate)
