= Dissolution of the Netherlands Antilles =

2010 dissolution of the autonomous Caribbean country of the Netherlands

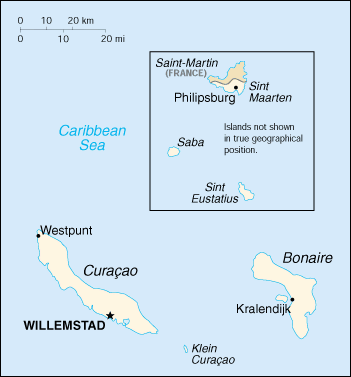
- The Netherlands Antilles before its complete dissolution in 2010
- Date: 1 January 1986 (Aruba), 10 October 2010
- Location: Netherlands Antilles
- Participants: Governments of the island territories of the Netherlands Antilles; Government of the Netherlands Antilles; Government of the Netherlands
- Outcome: Separation of Aruba in 1986 (Status aparte), complete dissolution in 2010

The Netherlands Antilles was an autonomous Caribbean country within the Kingdom of the Netherlands. It was dissolved on 10 October 2010.

After dissolution, the "BES islands" of the Dutch Caribbean—Bonaire, Sint Eustatius, and Saba—became the Caribbean Netherlands, "special municipalities" of the Netherlands proper—a structure that only exists in the Caribbean. Meanwhile Curaçao and Sint Maarten became constituent countries within the Kingdom of the Netherlands, the same status as Aruba gained before, when separated from the Netherlands Antilles on 1 January 1986.

== History ==
=== Background and Aruban secession movement ===
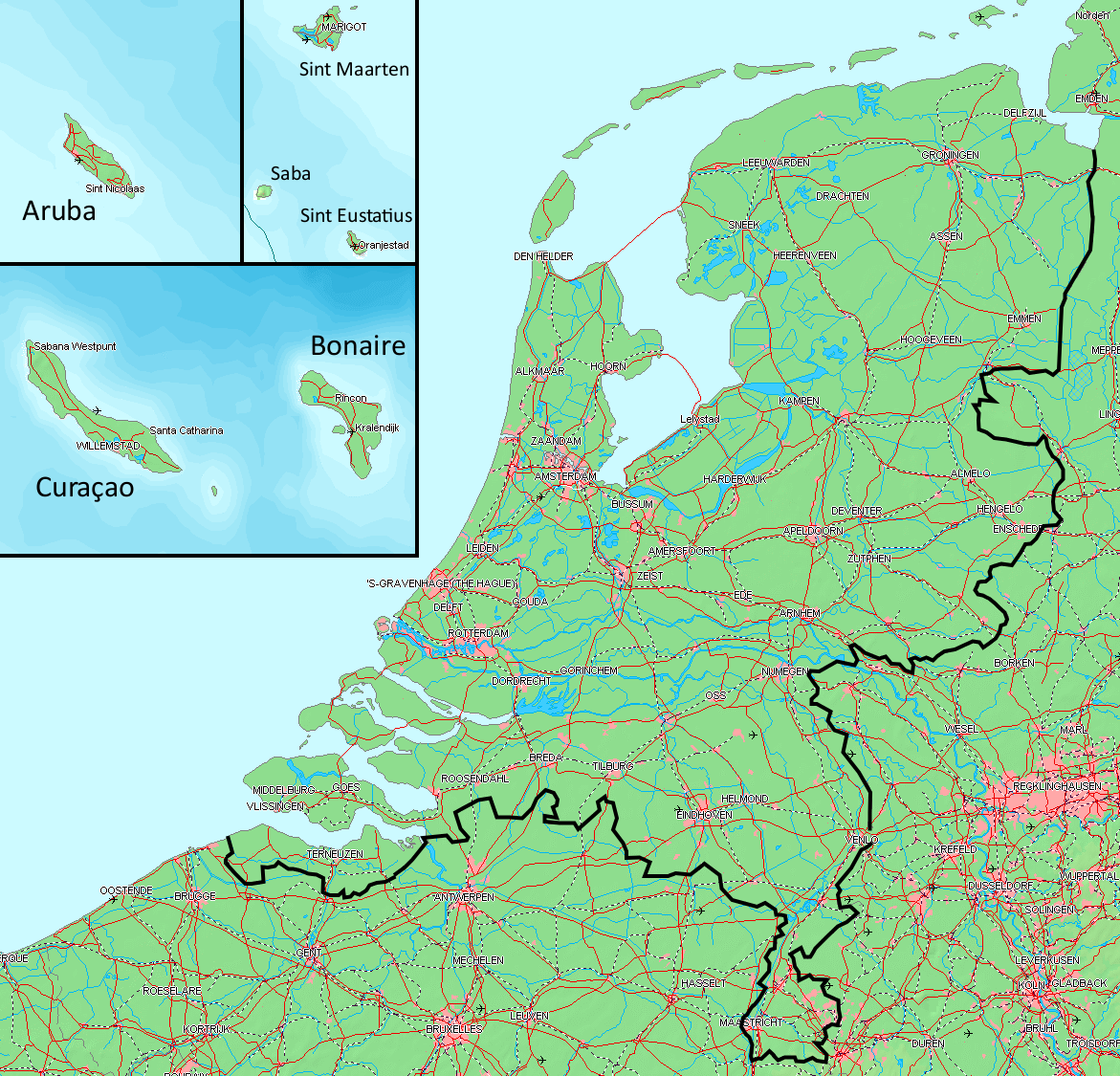
Map of the Kingdom of the Netherlands. The Netherlands and the Caribbean islands are to the same scale.

The idea of the Netherlands Antilles as a country within the Kingdom of the Netherlands never enjoyed the full support of all islands, and political relations between islands were often strained. Geographically, the Leeward Antilles islands of Aruba, Curaçao and Bonaire, and the Leeward Islands of Saba, Sint Eustatius and Sint Maarten lie almost 1,000 kilometres (620 mi) apart. Culturally, the Leeward Antilles (ABC Islands) have connections with the South American mainland, and its population speaks Papiamento, a Portuguese-based creole with heavy Spanish and Dutch influence. The other three islands (SSS Islands) are part of the English-speaking Caribbean.

When the new constitutional relationship between the Netherlands and its former West Indian colonies was enshrined in the Kingdom Charter of 1954, the colonial administrative division of the Netherlands Antilles, which was derived from the colony of Curaçao and Dependencies and grouped all six Caribbean islands together under one administration, was taken for granted. Aruban calls for secession from the Netherlands Antilles originated in the 1930s, and calls for the Netherlands Antilles as a whole to become independent increased after the Willemstad riots of 1969 in Curaçao. The government of the Netherlands Antilles feared that the whole territory would disintegrate if one of the islands seceded; Antillean Prime Minister Juancho Evertsz famously remarked that "six minus one equals zero".

Increasing unrest on Aruba, especially after a consultative referendum on secession was organized by the island government in 1977, meant that the issue of Aruban secession had to be taken into consideration. After long negotiations, it was agreed that Aruba could get its status aparte and become a separate country within the Kingdom of the Netherlands in 1986, but only on the condition that it would become fully independent in 1996. The People's Electoral Movement, which led the Aruban island government in the years to 1986, reluctantly agreed to this, but the Aruban People's Party, which came to power after 1986, refused all cooperation with the Netherlands on the issue of independence.

On the other hand, the Netherlands became more and more aware that the ties with the Caribbean parts of the Kingdom would probably endure for a longer period of time. Suriname, the other partner of the Kingdom that attained independence in 1975, had gone through a period of dictatorship and civil war, which weakened the pro-independence ideology of the Dutch government. Aruba and the Netherlands agreed in July 1990 to delete Article 62, which foresaw Aruban independence in 1996, from the Charter. This was finalized in 1994, with some conditions about cooperation in the fields of justice, good governance and finance.

=== Wake of Aruban secession ===
Meanwhile, the permanent position of Aruba as a separate country within the Kingdom led to calls for a similar arrangement for the other islands, especially on Sint Maarten. In the early 1990s, the five remaining islands entered into a period of reflection about whether or not to remain part of the Netherlands Antilles. In March 1990, Dutch Minister of Aruban and Antillean Affairs Ernst Hirsch Ballin came up with a draft for a new Kingdom Charter, in which the Leeward Antilles islands of Curaçao and Bonaire, and the Leeward Islands of Saba, Sint Eustatius and Sint Maarten would form two new countries within the Kingdom. This proposal met with mixed responses on the islands.

After a committee was installed investigating the future of the Netherlands Antilles, a "Conference on the Future" ("Toekomstconferentie" in Dutch, lit. "Future-Conference") was held in 1993. The Netherlands proposed to take over the federal tasks of the Netherlands Antilles, with each of the islands remaining autonomous to the extent granted by the Islands Regulation of the Netherlands Antilles. Curaçao would be exempted and would attain country status like Aruba; Bonaire and Sint Maarten would be supported to help attain country status in the future; Saba and Sint Eustatius would not have this perspective and would remain what was called "Kingdom islands". The fact that the Kingdom affairs would also be broadened to include law enforcement to reduce international crime (thus reducing the autonomy of Aruba and Curaçao), and that Sint Maarten would not attain country status right away, meant that the Conference could only result in a failure.

It was decided to postpone the next meeting of the conference until after a status referendum was held on Curaçao. The referendum's result was in favour of maintaining and restructuring the Netherlands Antilles, in spite of the island government and the Netherlands Antillean government campaigning for country status. The other islands also voted for maintaining the Netherlands Antilles. The Party for the Restructured Antilles, composed of campaigners in favour of maintaining and restructuring the Netherlands Antilles, came to power.

=== New referendum cycle in the wake of Sint Maarten's vote for autonomy ===
In the end, restructuring the Netherlands Antilles did not get very far. Probably the most symbolic change was the adoption of an anthem of the Netherlands Antilles in 2000. In the same year another status vote was held on Sint Maarten, this time in favour of becoming a country of its own within the Kingdom. This sparked a new referendum cycle across the Netherlands Antilles. At the same time, a commission composed of representatives from the Netherlands and all the islands of the Netherlands Antilles investigated the future of the Netherlands Antilles. In its 2004 report, the commission advised a revision of the Charter for the Kingdom of the Netherlands in order to dissolve the Netherlands Antilles, so that Curaçao and Sint Maarten would become countries of their own within the Kingdom, while Bonaire, Sint Eustatius, and Saba would become "Kingdom islands."

The referendum held on Curaçao in 2005 also came out in favour of country status. Bonaire and Saba voted for closer ties with the Netherlands, whereas Sint Eustatius wanted to retain the Netherlands Antilles.

== Constitutional changes ==
=== Curaçao and Sint Maarten ===
Curaçao and Sint Maarten became two new "landen" (literally: countries) within the Kingdom of the Netherlands, along the lines of Aruba and the Netherlands. Their new joint currency is the Caribbean guilder, which was expected to be introduced by 2012 but has been delayed repeatedly, the currency was eventually introduced into circulation on 31 March 2025. Aruba's right to secede from the Kingdom was not extended to Curaçao and Sint Maarten.

=== Bonaire, Sint Eustatius, and Saba ===
The BES islands (Bonaire, Sint Eustatius, and Saba) have become direct parts of the Netherlands as special municipalities (bijzondere gemeenten), a form of "public body" (openbaar lichaam) as outlined in article 134 of the Dutch Constitution. The special municipalities do not constitute part of a province.

These municipalities resemble ordinary Dutch municipalities in most ways (they have a mayor, aldermen and a municipal council, for example) and will have to introduce most Dutch law. Residents will be able to vote in Dutch national and European elections.

The three islands will have to involve the Dutch Minister of Foreign Affairs before they can make agreements with countries in the region. The special municipalities would be represented in the Kingdom Government by the Netherlands, as they can vote for the States-General (the Dutch parliament).

On 1 January 2011, the three islands switched to the US dollar rather than the euro that is used in the European Netherlands.

=== Joint Court ===
All six islands may also continue to access the Joint Court of Justice of Aruba, Curaçao, Sint Maarten, and of Bonaire, Sint Eustatius and Saba, the court of appeal superior to the islands' own courts of first instance. The islands share the Supreme Court of the Netherlands in The Hague with the entire Kingdom, including the European Netherlands.

=== Status in the European Union ===
The Kingdom of the Netherlands is a member of the European Union. However, Aruba, Curaçao, and Sint Maarten have the status of overseas countries and territories (OCTs) and are not part of the EU. Nevertheless, only one type of citizenship exists within the Kingdom (Dutch), and all Dutch citizens are EU citizens (including those in the OCTs).

The Council of Ministers of the Kingdom of the Netherlands agreed not to change the status of Bonaire, Sint Eustatius, and Saba with regard to the EU in the first five years of integration of these islands into the Netherlands, after which a re-evaluation of the islands' EU status was to take place. The islands were thus to remain OCTs at least until 2015, and remained in this status as of 2022.

The Netherlands secured a provision in the Treaty of Lisbon that says that any Caribbean part of the Netherlands can opt for a change of status to Outermost Region (OMR) if it so wishes, without having to change the Treaties of the European Union.

=== Date of transition ===
On 1 September 2009, Saba announced that it wished to withdraw from the Netherlands Antilles immediately, rather than wait until October 2010. However, according to Dutch State Secretary Bijleveld for Kingdom Relations, it was not legally possible for Saba to become separate from the Antilles earlier.

The transition took place at midnight (00:00) on 10 October 2010 ("10/10/10") in the Netherlands Antilles (UTC-04:00), 06:00 in the European part of the Netherlands (UTC+02:00).

== Legal documents ==
=== Kingdom charter ===
The Kingdom Act amending the Charter for the Kingdom of the Netherlands was drafted on 20 January 2009. It consists of six articles, with the changes to the Charter included in articles one to three. The Kingdom law provides for article 3 to take effect on the date of publication of the law in the official journal of the Netherlands, and articles 1 and 2 at a later date to be specified by royal decree. In this way the future countries of Sint Maarten and Curaçao will be able to draft their constitutions and fundamental legislation before the new relations within the Kingdom are to take effect.

The House of Representatives adopted the bill on 15 April 2010, and the Senate on 6 July 2010. The Estates of the Netherlands Antilles adopted the bill on 20 August and the Estates of Aruba did the same on 4 September.

=== Legislation for the integration of Bonaire, Sint Eustatius and Saba into the Netherlands ===
On 21 November 2008, five draft acts for the integration of Bonaire, Sint Eustatius and Saba into the Netherlands were accepted by the Council of Ministers of the Kingdom. These acts are the Act on the public bodies of Bonaire, Sint Eustatius and Saba (Dutch: Wet op de openbare lichamen Bonaire, Sint Eustatius en Saba, abbreviated to WOLBES), the Act on financial relations of Bonaire, Saba and Sint Eustatius, the Amendment to the election act with regard to Bonaire, Saba and Sint Eustatius, the Introduction act on the public bodies of Bonaire, Saba and Sint Eustatius, and the Adaptation act on the public bodies of Bonaire, Saba and Sint Eustatius.

WOLBES defines the administrative organization of the public bodies and is modeled on Dutch municipality law. The Introduction act specifies that Netherlands Antilles law will remain in force after the transition of the three islands to the Dutch polity, and defines the process in which Dutch law will slowly take over from Netherlands Antilles law in the islands. The Adaptation act adapts Netherlands Antilles law and Dutch law and is to take effect immediately.

The House of Representatives adopted these acts on 9 March 2010, the Senate on 11 May.
