= Kingdom of the Netherlands =

Sovereign state

Kingdom of the Netherlands Koninkrijk der Nederlanden
- Flag Coat of arms
- Motto: "Je maintiendrai" (French) (English: "I will maintain")
- Anthem: "Wilhelmus" (Dutch)

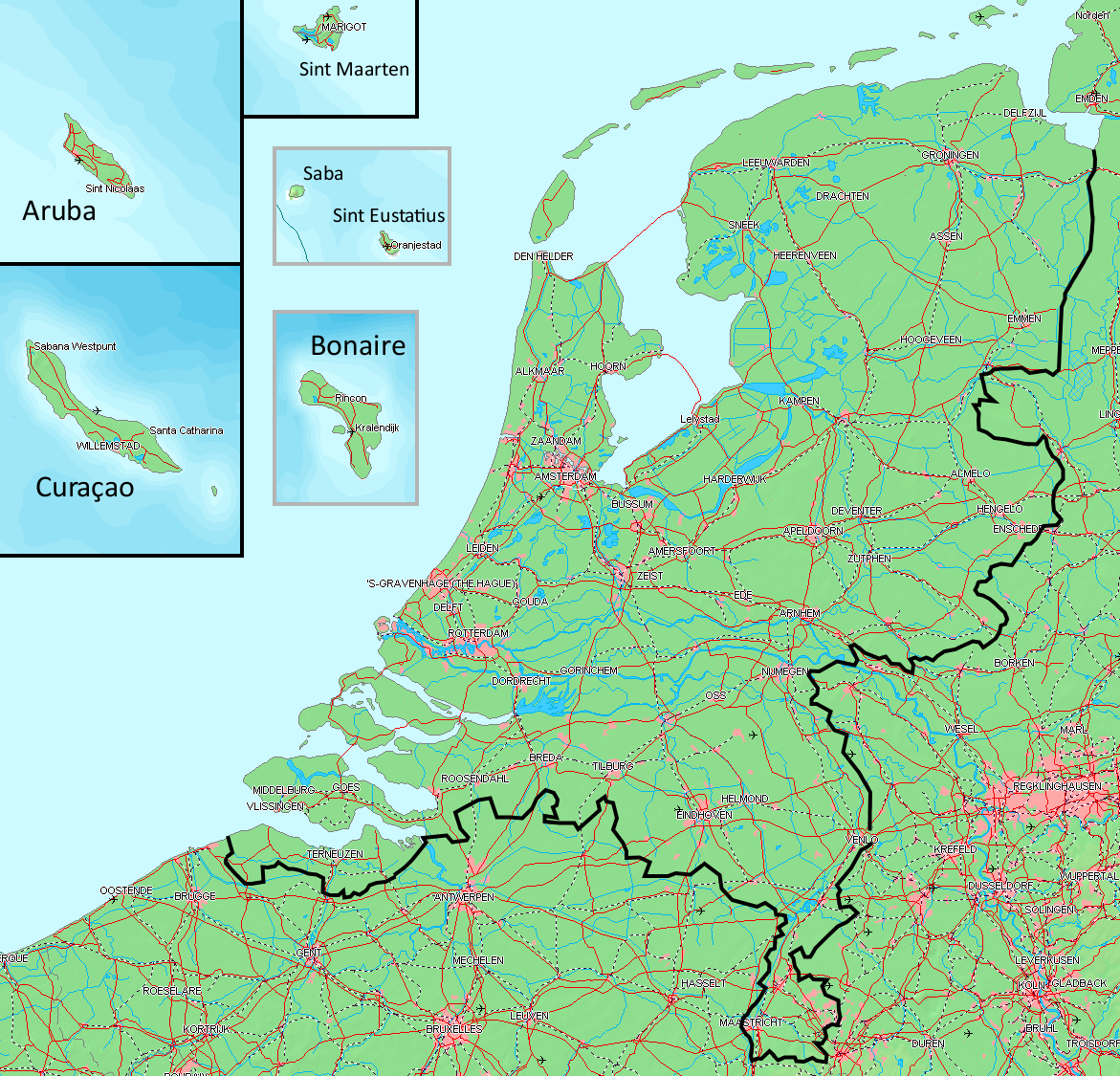
- Map of the four constituent countries shown to scale
- Capital and largest city: Amsterdam (Note: Amsterdam is the constitutional capital of the kingdom and the Netherlands, while The Hague is the seat of the government representing both; Oranjestad is the capital of Aruba; Willemstad is the capital of Curaçao; and Philipsburg is the capital of Sint Maarten.); 52°22′N 4°53′E
- Government seat: The Hague
- Official languages: Dutch (Note: Dutch is an official language in all four constituent countries. English is an official language in Curaçao and Sint Maarten, and has a formal status on Saba and Sint Eustatius. Papiamento is an official language in Aruba and Curaçao, and has a formal status on Bonaire. In Friesland, the West Frisian language has a formal status. Dutch Low Saxon, Dutch Sign Language, Limburgish, Sinte Romani and Yiddish are recognised as regional or non-territorial languages in the Netherlands.)
- Official regional languages: English; Papiamento; West Frisian
- Recognised languages: Dutch Low Saxon; Dutch Sign Language; Limburgish; Sinte Romani; Yiddish
- Demonym: Dutch
- Countries (non‑sovereign parts): Netherlands; Aruba; Curaçao; Sint Maarten
- Government: Constitutional monarchy comprising four autonomous constituent countries
  - Monarch: Willem-Alexander
  - Prime Minister (Note: The Prime Minister of the Netherlands is referred to as "Our Prime Minister, in his capacity as chairman of the Council of Ministers of the Kingdom" (Dutch: Onze Minister-President, in zijn hoedanigheid van voorzitter van de raad van ministers van het Koninkrijk) when he acts as a Minister of the Kingdom. An example of this can be found in article 2(3a) of the Act on financial supervision for Curaçao and Sint Maarten. Other ministers of the Netherlands are referred to with the additional line "in his capacity as Minister of the Kingdom" (Dutch: in zijn hoedanigheid van Minister van het Koninkrijk) when they act as Kingdom Ministers, as for example with "Our Minister of Justice in his capacity as Minister of the Kingdom" (Dutch: Onze Minister van Justitie in zijn hoedanigheid van minister van het Koninkrijk), except for the Minister of Foreign Affairs and the Minister of Defence, since they always act in a Kingdom capacity. For more information on this, see Borman 2005 and Borman 2010.): Rob Jetten
  - Minister Plenipotentiary of Aruba: Mildred Schwengle
  - Minister Plenipotentiary of Curaçao: Sidney Justiana
  - Minister Plenipotentiary of Sint Maarten: Gracita Arrindell

Independence from Spain and France
  - Dutch Republic: 26 July 1581 (declared); 30 January 1648 (recognised)
  - Batavian Republic: 19 January 1795
  - Kingdom of Holland: 5 June 1806
  - Annexation by First French Empire: 1 July 1810
  - Kingdom of the Netherlands: 16 March 1815
  - Secession of Belgium: 4 October 1830 (declared); 19 April 1839 (recognised)
  - Indonesian independence: 17 August 1945 (proclaimed); 27 December 1949 (sovereignty transferred)
  - Admitted to the United Nations: 24 October 1945
  - Charter for the Kingdom (colonial inclusion): 15 December 1954
- Currency: 4 currencies: Euro (EUR); (Europe); United States dollar (USD); (Caribbean Netherlands); Caribbean guilder (XCG); (Curaçao/Sint Maarten); Aruban florin (AWG); (Aruba)
- Time zone: European Netherlands: CET (UTC+1); CEST (UTC+2) (DST) Caribbean Netherlands: AST (UTC-4); DST not observed
- Date format: dd-mm-yyyy
- Calling code: 4 codes: +31 (Netherlands); +297 (Aruba); +599 (Curaçao / Caribbean); +1 721 (Sint Maarten)
- ISO 3166 code: NL
- Internet TLD: 6 TLDs: .nl (Netherlands) (Note: Also .eu, shared with other EU member states.); .frl (Fryslân); .aw (Aruba); .cw (Curaçao); .sx (Sint Maarten); .bq (Caribbean Netherlands) (Note: .bq is designated, but not in use, for the Caribbean Netherlands.)

The Kingdom of the Netherlands, (Note: Dutch: Koninkrijk der Nederlanden, pronounced [ˈkoːnɪŋkrɛiɡ dɛr ˈneːdərlɑndə(n)];, (Note: In isolation, Koninkrijk is pronounced [ˈkoːnɪŋkrɛik].) West Frisian: Keninkryk fan de Nederlannen, Papiamento: Reino Hulandes) commonly known simply as the Netherlands, (Note: Not to be confused with the constituent country, the Netherlands, which is only a part of the Kingdom. In some contexts "the Netherlands" refers to the constituent country, in more formal contexts it may refer to the Kingdom.) is a sovereign state consisting of a collection of constituent territories united under the monarch of the Netherlands, who functions as head of state. The realm is a unitary monarchy with its largest subdivision, the eponymous Netherlands, predominantly located in Northwestern Europe and with three smaller island territories located in the Caribbean.

The four subdivisions of the Kingdom—Aruba, Curaçao, the Netherlands, and Sint Maarten—are constituent countries (landen in Dutch; sing. land) and participate on a basis of equality as partners in the Kingdom. All four are autonomous with their own parliaments, however, the Kingdom itself is administered in the constituent country of the Netherlands, which comprises roughly 98% of the Kingdom's land area and population, with matters like foreign policy and defence done on behalf of the entire Kingdom.

The vast majority of land area of the constituent country of the Netherlands is in Europe, while its three special municipalities (Bonaire, Saba, and Sint Eustatius) are located in the Caribbean, as are the other three constituent countries.

== History ==
The Kingdom of the Netherlands originated in the aftermath of the defeat of French Emperor Napoleon I. The Netherlands regained its independence from France in 1813 as the Sovereign Principality of the United Netherlands, after having been annexed by the First French Empire in 1810. The great powers of Europe, united against Napoleonic France, had decided in the secret treaty of the London Protocol to establish a single state in the territories that were previously the Dutch Republic/Batavian Republic/Kingdom of Holland, the Austrian Netherlands and the Prince-Bishopric of Liège, awarding rule over this to William Frederick, Prince of Orange and Nassau, the son of William V, the last stadholder of the Dutch Republic. The southern territories remained under Prussian (German) rule until Napoleon's return from his first exile on Elba ("Hundred Days").

In March 1815, amidst the turmoil of the Hundred Days, William Frederick adopted the style of "William I, king of the Netherlands". Following Napoleon's second defeat at the Battle of Waterloo in June 1815, the Vienna Congress supplied international recognition of William's unilateral move. The new king of the Netherlands was also made Grand Duke of Luxembourg, a part of the Kingdom that was, at the same time, a member state of the German Confederation.

=== Belgium and Luxembourg independence ===
In 1830, the southerners, calling themselves Belgians, seceded from the Kingdom, a step that was recognised by the Netherlands only in 1839 in the Treaty of London. In 1839 Luxembourg ceased to be part of the Kingdom of the Netherlands and continued as a grand duchy in personal union with the Dutch monarch until 1890. Luxembourg also lost more than half of its territory to Belgium. To compensate the German Confederation for that loss, the remainder of the Dutch province of Limburg received the same status that Luxembourg had enjoyed before, as a Dutch province that at the same time formed a Duchy of the German Confederation. That status was reversed when the German Confederation ceased to exist in 1867, when Limburg became an ordinary Dutch province.

=== Decolonisation ===
Slavery was abolished by law in Suriname and the Dutch Caribbean colonies on 1 July 1863. In Suriname, however, many formerly enslaved people were required to continue plantation labour under state supervision for another ten years, so for many emancipation was not effectively completed until 1 July 1873.

Before the Charter for the Kingdom of the Netherlands was proclaimed in 1954, Suriname, Netherlands New Guinea, and the Netherlands Antilles, (formerly, Kolonie Curaçao en Onderhorige Eilanden, "Colony of Curaçao and subordinates") were colonies of the Netherlands.

The Kingdom's 1954 administrative reform was sparked by the 1941 Atlantic Charter (stating "the right of all peoples to choose the form of government under which they will live, and the desire for a permanent system of general security"), which was signed by the Netherlands on 1 January 1942. Changes were proposed in the 7 December 1942 radio speech by Queen Wilhelmina. In this speech, the Queen, on behalf of the Dutch government in exile in London, expressed a desire to review the relations between the Netherlands and its colonies after the end of the war. After liberation, the government would call a conference to agree on a settlement in which the overseas territories could participate in the administration of the Kingdom on the basis of equality. Initially, this speech had propaganda purposes; the Dutch government had the Dutch East Indies (now Indonesia) in mind, and hoped to appease public opinion in the United States, which had become sceptical towards colonialism.

With Indonesia's independence, a temporary confederal constitution was established through the Linggadjati Agreement in 1946, which mandated the creation of a Netherlands-Indonesia Union. However, this arrangement was considered burdensome, as the two nations differed in their interpretations and expectations of the Linggadjati Agreement. The Netherlands advocated for a 'heavy union' led by the Dutch monarch, while Indonesia favoured a loose organisation opting individual sovereignty. The union was virtually collapsed by 1954 over the West New Guinea dispute, leaving the Dutch an opportunity to reorganise their colonial holdings.

Initially, a federal constitution was considered too heavy as the economies of Suriname and the Netherlands Antilles were insignificant compared to that of the Netherlands. By the Charter for the Kingdom of the Netherlands, as enacted in 1954, a composite state was created (also known as the "Tripartite Kingdom of the Netherlands"), consisting of the Netherlands (proper), Suriname and the Netherlands Antilles. Under the provisions of the Charter, both former colonies were granted internal autonomy. Suriname and the Netherlands Antilles each got a Minister Plenipotentiary based in the Netherlands, who had the right to participate in Dutch cabinet meetings that discussed affairs of the Kingdom as a whole when they pertained directly to Suriname or the Netherlands Antilles. Delegates of Suriname and the Netherlands Antilles could participate in sessions of the First and Second Chamber of the States General. An overseas member could be added to the Council of State when appropriate. According to the Charter, Suriname and the Netherlands Antilles could each alter its "Basic Law" (Staatsregeling). The right of the two autonomous countries to leave the Kingdom, unilaterally, was not recognised; yet it also stipulated that the Charter could be dissolved by mutual consultation.

Suriname was a constituent country within the Kingdom from 1954 to 1975, while the Netherlands Antilles was a constituent country from 1954 until 2010. Suriname has since become an independent republic, and the Netherlands Antilles was divided into six. Three are constituent countries: Aruba (since 1986), Curaçao and Sint Maarten (since 2010); three are special municipalities of the Netherlands proper: Bonaire, Sint Eustatius and Saba. Netherlands New Guinea was a dependent territory of the Kingdom until 1962, followed by seven-month transitional period when it was annexed by Indonesia. It was not an autonomous country, and was not mentioned in the Charter.

In 1955, Queen Juliana and Prince Bernhard visited Suriname and the Netherlands Antilles. The royal couple were welcomed enthusiastically by the local population, and the trip was widely reported in the Dutch press. Several other royal visits were to follow.

On 30 May 1969, a labour dispute on Curaçao developed into the Trinta di Mei uprising. Parts of central Willemstad were damaged by fire and looting, and Dutch marines were deployed after the local authorities lost control of the situation. Suriname also experienced a major teachers' strike in 1969; the mass action contributed to the fall of the Pengel government.

In 1973, a new Dutch cabinet under Labour leader Joop den Uyl assumed power. In the government policy statement, the cabinet declared a wish to determine a date for the independence of Suriname and the Netherlands Antilles with the governments of those nations. The Antillean government was non-committal; the same held for the Surinamese Sedney cabinet (1969–1973). Suriname's 1973 elections brought the National Party Combination (Nationale Partij Kombinatie) to power, with Henck Arron as prime minister. The new government declared that Suriname would be independent before 1976. This was remarkable, as independence had not been an issue during the election campaign. The Den Uyl government in The Hague now had a willing partner in Paramaribo to realise its plans for Surinamese independence. Despite vehement and emotional resistance by the Surinamese opposition, Den Uyl and Arron reached an agreement, and, on 25 November 1975, Suriname became independent.

In 1986 Aruba acquired separate status as a country within the Kingdom. On 10 October 2010 the Netherlands Antilles ceased to exist: Curaçao and Sint Maarten became countries within the Kingdom, and Bonaire, Sint Eustatius and Saba became public bodies of the Netherlands.

=== Modern events ===
The Kingdom celebrated its bicentennial in a series of festive occasions spanning from 2013 to 2015, the last being the year of the actual 200th anniversary of the Kingdom.

== Constituent countries ==
The Kingdom of the Netherlands consists of four constituent countries: the Netherlands, Aruba, Curaçao, and Sint Maarten. There is a difference between the Kingdom of the Netherlands and the Netherlands: the Kingdom of the Netherlands is the comprehensive sovereign state, while the Netherlands is one of its four constituent countries. Three Caribbean islands (Aruba, Curaçao, and Sint Maarten) are the three remaining constituent countries. Three other Caribbean islands (Bonaire, Sint Eustatius, and Saba) are special municipalities within the country of the Netherlands. Until its dissolution in 2010, the islands had formed the Netherlands Antilles, with the exception of Aruba, which left the grouping in 1986.

Constituent countries of the Kingdom of the Netherlands
Country	Population (as of November 2019)	Percentage of Kingdom's population	Area	Percentage of Kingdom's area	Population density
Subdivision	Population (as of November 2019)	Percentage of Kingdom's population	Area	Percentage of Kingdom's area	Population density
Netherlands (Note: The population statistics of the Central Bureau of Statistics for the Netherlands do not include the Caribbean Netherlands ("Niet-gemeentelijke indelingen". Centraal Bureau voor de Statistiek. Archived from the original on 9 September 2015, 2). The number given here results from adding the population statistics of the Netherlands with those of the Caribbean Netherlands.)	17,424,978	98.24%	41,873 km^{2} (16,167 sq mi)	98.45%	516/km^{2} (1,340/sq mi)
European Netherlands	17,399,821	98.10%	41,545 km^{2} (16,041 sq mi)	97.68%	521/km^{2} (1,350/sq mi)
Bonaire^{†‡}	20,104	0.11%	288 km^{2} (111 sq mi)	0.69%	69/km^{2} (180/sq mi)
Sint Eustatius^{†‡}	3,138	0.02%	21 km^{2} (8.1 sq mi)	0.05%	150/km^{2} (390/sq mi)
Saba^{†‡}	1,915	0.01%	13 km^{2} (5.0 sq mi)	0.03%	148/km^{2} (380/sq mi)
Aruba^{†}	112,309	0.63%	180 km^{2} (69 sq mi)	0.42%	624/km^{2} (1,620/sq mi)
Curaçao^{†}	158,665	0.89%	444 km^{2} (171 sq mi)	1.04%	358/km^{2} (930/sq mi)
Sint Maarten^{†}	41,486	0.23%	34 km^{2} (13 sq mi)	0.08%	1,221/km^{2} (3,160/sq mi)
Kingdom of the Netherlands	17,737,438	100.00%	42,525 km^{2} (16,419 sq mi)	100.00%	515/km^{2} (1,330/sq mi)
^{†} Forms a part of the Dutch Caribbean.^{‡} Forms a part of the Caribbean Netherlands.

Comparison table

Part	Currency	Major languages	Major religions
European Netherlands	Euro	Dutch, Frisian	No religion, Catholic, Protestant
Bonaire	US dollar	Papiamento, Dutch (official)	Catholic, Protestant
Sint Eustatius	US dollar	English, Dutch (official)	Protestant, Catholic, No religion
Saba	US dollar	English, Dutch (official)	Catholic, Protestant, No religion
Aruba	Aruban florin	Papiamento, Dutch (official), English, Spanish	Catholic
Curaçao	Caribbean guilder	Papiamento, Dutch (official)	Catholic, Protestant
Sint Maarten	Caribbean guilder	English, Dutch (official), Spanish	Protestant, Catholic

=== Netherlands ===
Tree structure of subdivisions of the Kingdom of the Netherlands, showing the geographic location of its four constituent countries

The Netherlands is a representative parliamentary democracy organised as a unitary state. Its administration consists of the Monarch and the Council of Ministers, which is headed by a Prime Minister (Rob Jetten since 2026). The people are represented by the States General of the Netherlands, which consists of a House of Representatives and a Senate. The Netherlands is divided into 12 provinces: Drenthe, Flevoland, Friesland, Gelderland, Groningen, Limburg, North Brabant, North Holland, Overijssel, South Holland, Utrecht and Zeeland. The provinces are divided into municipalities. The Netherlands has the euro as its currency, except in the special municipalities of the Caribbean Netherlands (BES islands), where the Netherlands Antillean guilder was replaced by the U.S. dollar in 2011.

==== Caribbean Netherlands: Bonaire, Sint Eustatius, and Saba ====
The special municipalities of Bonaire, Sint Eustatius, and Saba, together referred to as Caribbean Netherlands or BES islands, are islands in the Caribbean that are part of the Netherlands proper but not part of any Dutch province. They resemble ordinary Dutch municipalities in most ways (with a mayor, aldermen, and a municipal council, for example) and are subject to the ordinary Dutch legislative process. Residents of these three islands are also able to vote in Dutch national and European elections. There are, however, some derogations for these islands. Social security, for example, is not on the same level as it is in the Netherlands proper. In November 2008, it was decided to introduce the U.S. dollar in the three islands. The date of introduction was 1 January 2011. The Netherlands carries the risk of exchange rate fluctuations regarding cash flows between the state and the islands.

=== Aruba ===
Aruba, with its own constitution, is a representative parliamentary democracy organised as a unitary state. Its administration consists of the Governor, who represents the Monarch, and the (Aruban) Council of Ministers, headed by a Prime Minister. The sovereign people of Aruba are represented by 21 parliamentarians in the Parliament of Aruba. The Governor of Aruba is Alfonso Boekhoudt, and the Prime Minister is Mike Eman. It has its own Central Bank and currency, the Aruban florin, linked to the U.S. dollar; the U.S. dollar is accepted almost everywhere on the island. Aruba has two official languages: its own national language Papiamento and the Kingdom of the Netherlands' Dutch language.

=== Curaçao ===
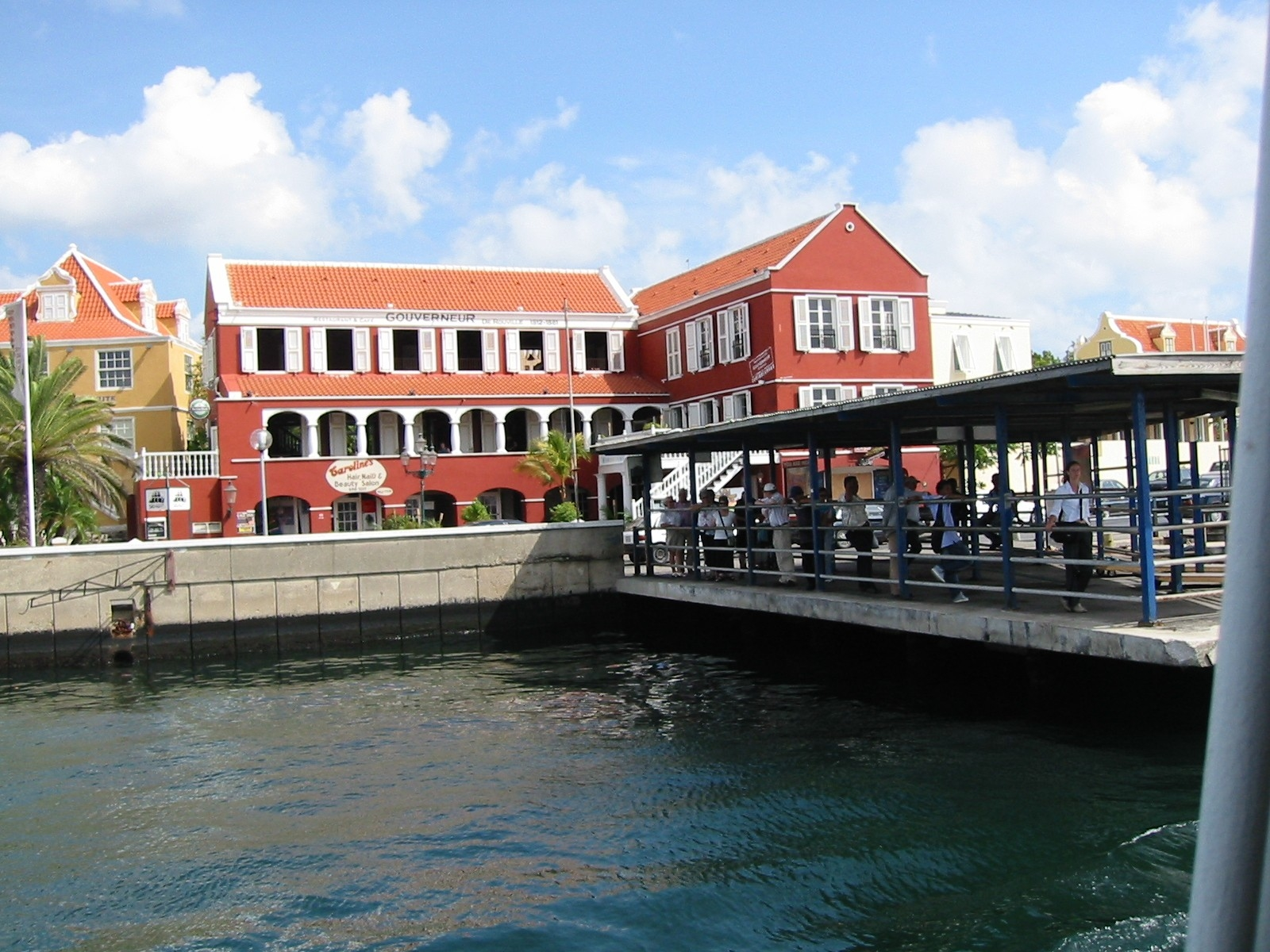
Historic Area of Willemstad, declared a World Heritage Site by UNESCO in 1997

Curaçao is an autonomous country within the Kingdom with its own constitution and a 21-member parliament. The Governor is Mauritsz de Kort, who took office in November 2025, and the Prime Minister is Gilmar Pisas. The President of Parliament is Fergino Brownbill. The Caribbean guilder (XCG) has been legal tender in Curaçao since 31 March 2025.

=== Sint Maarten ===
Sint Maarten is an autonomous country within the Kingdom occupying the southern part of the island of Saint Martin; the northern part is the French Collectivity of Saint Martin. The Governor is Ajamu Baly and the Prime Minister is Luc Mercelina. The Caribbean guilder (XCG) has been legal tender since 31 March 2025.

== Institutions ==
=== Charter and constitutions ===
Aruba, Curaçao, and Sint Maarten regulate the governance of their respective countries, but are subordinate to the Charter for the Kingdom of the Netherlands. The Netherlands is ruled by the provisions and institutions of the Constitution for the Kingdom of the Netherlands that also constitutes and regulates the institutions of the Kingdom as a whole as mentioned in the Charter. The Constitution is also subordinate to the Charter. The provisions in the Charter for some of these institutions are additional and are applicable only for those affairs of the Kingdom, as described in the Charter, when they affect Aruba, Curaçao, or Sint Maarten directly. In cases where affairs of the Kingdom do not affect Aruba, Curaçao, or Sint Maarten, they are dealt with according to the provisions laid down in the Constitution. In these cases the Netherlands, the jurisdiction ruled directly by the Constitution for the Kingdom of the Netherlands, acts alone, according to its constitution and in its capacity as the Kingdom of the Netherlands. The other three countries cannot do the same for affairs of the Kingdom that only pertain to them and not to the Netherlands proper. In these cases, the provisions of the Charter prevail.

Article 55 provides that amendments to the Charter are made by Kingdom Act and, after passage by the States General, require acceptance by Aruba, Curaçao and Sint Maarten before royal approval.

=== Government ===
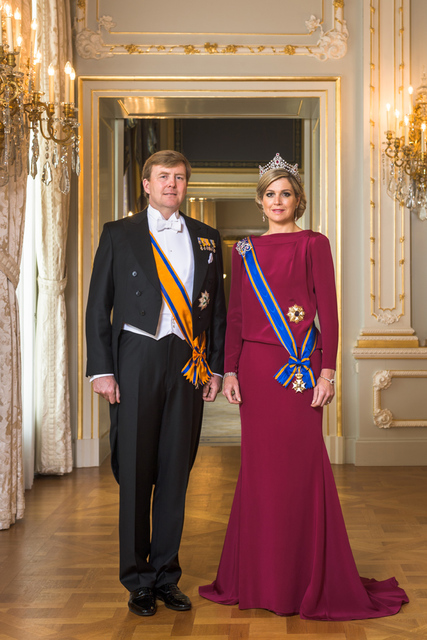
King Willem-Alexander of the Netherlands, the reigning monarch of the Kingdom of the Netherlands, and his wife Queen Máxima of the Netherlands (2013)

The Monarch and the ministers he appoints form the Government of the Kingdom. According to Article 7 of the Charter, the Council of Ministers of the Kingdom of the Netherlands consists of the Council of Ministers of the Netherlands complemented by one Minister Plenipotentiary of Aruba, one Minister Plenipotentiary of Curaçao, and one Minister Plenipotentiary of Sint Maarten. The Dutch Prime Minister chairs the Council of Ministers of the Kingdom.

In December 2007, a Deputy Council for Kingdom Relations was established. This deputy council prepares the meetings of the Council of Ministers of the Kingdom. The establishment of such a Council has long been advocated by the Council of State of the Kingdom.

The Government and the Council of Ministers of the Kingdom, along with the monarchy itself, are subject to Article 5 of the Charter that refers their regulation mainly to the Constitution for the Kingdom of the Netherlands as far as the Charter for the Kingdom of the Netherlands does not provide for that.

Two legal instruments are available at the Kingdom level: the Kingdom act (Dutch: Rijkswet) and the Order-in-Council for the Kingdom (Dutch: Algemene maatregel van Rijksbestuur). An example of a Kingdom act is the "Kingdom Act regarding Dutch citizenship" (Dutch: Rijkswet op het Nederlanderschap).

The Monarch of the Netherlands is the head of state of the Kingdom. The Monarch is represented in Aruba, Curaçao, and Sint Maarten by a governor.

==== Defense ====
Maintenance of the independence and defence of the Kingdom is a Kingdom affair under Article 3 of the Charter. Foreign relations are likewise a Kingdom affair.

=== Legislature ===
For Kingdom legislation, the States General of the Netherlands forms the parliamentary legislature together with the Kingdom government, subject to the special participation rights for Aruba, Curaçao and Sint Maarten laid down in Articles 15–21 of the Charter. Their ministers plenipotentiary and special delegates can participate in the consideration of Kingdom bills in the circumstances specified by the Charter.

=== Council of State ===
Article 13 of the Charter specifies that there is a Council of State of the Kingdom. It is (as all institutions of the Kingdom) regulated in the Constitution, but the Charter implies that at the request of Aruba, Curaçao, or Sint Maarten, a member from each of these islands can be included in the Council of State. Aruba is currently exercising this right. This has not always been the case; the Netherlands Antilles had no member until 1987 and Aruba had none until 2000. The current Kingdom councillors are Paul Comenencia for Curaçao, Andy Lee for Aruba and Randolf Duggins for Sint Maarten; Duggins took office on 1 October 2025.

== Judiciary ==
The Hoge Raad der Nederlanden is the supreme court of the Kingdom by virtue of the Cassation regulation for the Netherlands Antilles and Aruba. The basis for this regulation is article 23 of the Charter. The second paragraph of that article specifies that if an overseas country of the Kingdom so requests, the Kingdom Act should provide for an additional court member from that country. To date, neither Aruba, Curaçao, nor Sint Maarten has used this right.

According to Article 39 of the Charter, "civil and commercial law, the law of civil procedure, criminal law, the law of criminal procedure, copyright, industrial property, the office of notary, and provisions concerning weights and measures shall be regulated as far as possible in a similar manner in the Netherlands, Aruba, Curaçao and Sint Maarten". The Article further stipulates that when a drastic amendment of the existing legislation in regard to these matters is proposed, the proposal shall not be submitted to or considered by a representative assembly until the Governments in the other countries have had the opportunity to express their views on the matter.

=== Mutual arbitration between the constituent countries and the Kingdom ===
In case of a conflict between a constituent country and the Kingdom, Article 12 of the Charter prescribes an administrative reconciliation procedure. This was often deemed a democratic deficit of the Kingdom, leading to the adoption of an amendment to the Charter, which entered into force on 23 November 2010. The new Article 12a specifies that in addition to the administrative reconciliation procedure, "by Kingdom Act measures shall be made allowing for the arbitration of certain conflicts, as specified by Kingdom Act, between the Kingdom and the countries." The imperative formulation was the result of an amendment in the Chamber of Representatives by special delegates Evelyn Wever-Croes and J.E. Thijsen of Aruba; the original formulation was "by Kingdom Act measures can be made".

The new Article 38a allows for measures to be made for arbitration between countries as well. In contrast with Article 12a, this article is not imperatively formulated.

== Kingdom affairs ==
Article 3 of the Charter specifies the Affairs of the Kingdom:

- maintenance of the independence and the defence of the Kingdom;
- foreign relations;
- Dutch nationality;
- regulation of the orders of chivalry, the flag and the coat of arms of the Kingdom;
- regulation of the nationality of vessels and the standards required for the safety and navigation of seagoing vessels flying the flag of the Kingdom, with the exception of sailing ships;
- supervision of the general rules governing the admission and expulsion of Netherlands nationals;
- general rules on admission and expulsion of Dutch nationals and aliens; and
- extradition.

One additional Kingdom affair is specified in article 43(2):

- The safeguarding of fundamental human rights and freedoms, legal certainty and good governance shall be a Kingdom affair.

Paragraph 2 of Article 3 specifies that "other matters may be declared to be Kingdom affairs in consultation".

These Kingdom affairs are only taken care of by the Council of Ministers of the Kingdom of the Netherlands, if the affair affects Aruba, Curaçao or St. Maarten. Article 14, paragraph 3, of the Charter, foresees the handling of Kingdom affairs in all other cases by the Netherlands.

On the basis of Article 38, the countries of the Kingdom can decide to adopt a Kingdom Act outside of the scope of the aforementioned Kingdom affairs. Such acts are referred to as Consensus Kingdom Acts, as they require the consent of the parliaments of Aruba, Curaçao and St. Maarten.

=== Foreign relations ===
The Kingdom negotiates and concludes international treaties and agreements. Those that do not affect Aruba, Curaçao, or Sint Maarten directly are dealt with by the provisions of the Constitution (in fact by the Netherlands alone). Article 24 of the Charter specifies that when an international treaty or agreement affects Aruba, Curaçao, or Sint Maarten, the treaty or agreement concerned shall be submitted to their representative assemblies. The article further specifies that when such a treaty or agreement is submitted for the tacit approval of the States General of the Netherlands (Dutch: Staten-Generaal der Nederlanden), the Ministers Plenipotentiary may communicate their wish that the treaty or agreement concerned shall be subject to the express approval of the States General.

Article 25 gives Aruba, Curaçao, and Sint Maarten the opportunity to opt out from an international treaty or agreement. The treaty or agreement concerned then has to specify that the treaty or agreement does not apply to Aruba, Curaçao, or Sint Maarten.

Article 26 specifies that when Aruba, Curaçao, or Sint Maarten communicate their wish for the conclusion of an international economic or financial agreement that applies solely to the country concerned, the Government of the Kingdom shall assist in the conclusion of such an agreement, unless this would be inconsistent with the country's ties with the Kingdom.

Article 27 specifies the involvement of Aruba, Curaçao, and Sint Maarten in the preparations for a treaty or agreement that affects them and Article 28 specifies that Aruba, Curaçao, or Sint Maarten may, if they so desire, accede to membership of international organisations.

Among other affiliations, the kingdom is also a founding member of NATO, OECD and WTO.

== Constitutional nature ==
Most scholars agree that it is difficult to group the constitutional arrangements of the Kingdom in one of the traditional models of state organisation, and consider the Kingdom to be a sui generis arrangement. Instead, the Kingdom is said to have characteristics of a federal state, a confederation, a federacy, and a devolved unitary state.

The Kingdom's federal characteristics include the delineation of Kingdom affairs in the Charter, the enumeration of the constituent countries in the Charter, the precedence of the Charter in the constitutional order, the establishment of Kingdom institutions, and the existence of Kingdom-level legal instruments.

Its confederal characteristics include the fact that the Charter can only be amended by consensus among the constituent countries.

Characteristics that point more or less to a federacy include the fact that the functioning of the institutions of the Kingdom is governed by the Constitution of the Netherlands where the Charter does not provide for them. The Charter also does not provide a procedure for the enactment of Kingdom acts; articles 81 to 88 of the Constitution of the Netherlands also apply for Kingdom acts, but with some additions and corrections stipulated in articles 15 to 22 of the Charter. The only Kingdom institution that requires the participation of the Caribbean countries in a mandatory way is the Council of Ministers of the Kingdom; both the Supreme Court and the Council of State of the Kingdom only include Caribbean members if one or more Caribbean countries ask for it, and the Caribbean countries are almost completely excluded from participating in the Kingdom's legislature. They can, however, participate in the drafting of a Kingdom act and their Ministers Plenipotentiary can oppose a Kingdom act otherwise supported by the Kingdom government in front of the Kingdom's parliament. Furthermore, according to article 15 of the Charter, the Ministers Plenipotentiary can request the Kingdom parliament to introduce a draft Kingdom act. Last, but not least, the Netherlands can, according to article 14 of the Charter, conduct Kingdom affairs on its own if conducting such affairs does not affect Aruba, Curaçao, or Sint Maarten. Aruba, Curaçao, and Sint Maarten do not have this right.

A characteristic that points to a devolved unitary state is the ability of the Kingdom government, according to article 50 of the Charter, to render a legislative or administrative measure of one of the Caribbean countries void if it is inconsistent with the Charter, an international agreement, a Kingdom act, an Order-in-Council for the Kingdom, or if it regulates an otherwise Kingdom affair.

The constitutional structure of the Kingdom is summarised by constitutional scholar C. Borman, in an often-cited definition, as follows:

a voluntary association of autonomous countries in a sovereign Kingdom that is placed above them, in which the institutions of the Kingdom largely coincide with the institutions of the largest country, in which on the level of the Kingdom only a few affairs are governed, and in which from the level of the Kingdom a limited influence can be exerted on the smaller countries.

Constitutional scholar C. A. J. M. Kortmann speaks of an "association of countries that has characteristics of a federation, yet one of its own kind." Belinfante and De Reede do speak about a "federal association" without any reservations.

=== Comparisons ===
Despite being of a sui generis constitutional nature, some other states have similar properties. In particular, the Kingdom of Denmark consists of Denmark, Greenland, and the Faroe Islands; the Realm of New Zealand consists of New Zealand, the Cook Islands, Niue, Tokelau, and the Ross Dependency. These comparisons are not exact; for instance, aside from the King of New Zealand, there is no constitutional structure shared between New Zealand, the Cook Islands, and Niue.

Other states also have multiple territories, but such territories are distinct. Some states, such as the United Kingdom and its overseas territories, as well as the United States and its insular areas, do not consider their external territories as integral parts of the state.

Other states, such as the Commonwealth of Australia, do treat their external territories as integral components, but have only one country/nationality level equivalent to the state.

== Relationship with the European Union ==
The Kingdom of the Netherlands is a founding member state of the European Union. Although originally both Suriname and the Netherlands Antilles were explicitly excluded from association with the European Economic Community by means of a special protocol attached to the Treaty of Rome, the status of Suriname as an overseas country (OCT) of the Community was established by a Supplementary Act completing the instrument of ratification of the Kingdom of the Netherlands on 1 September 1962. The Convention on the association of the Netherlands Antilles with the European Economic Community entered into force on 1 October 1964, signalling the attainment of OCT status by the Netherlands Antilles. Suriname is now an independent republic and a sovereign country, outside the EU. The Antilles have been dissolved.

The Caribbean islands, including the BES islands that are part of the Netherlands proper, are OCTs. Since citizenship is a Kingdom affair, and is thus not distinguished for the four countries, citizens from all four countries are also citizens of the European Union. However, these territories are not part of the European Union.

== Constitutional reform of the Netherlands Antilles ==
In 2004, a joint commission proposed major reforms for the Netherlands Antilles. On 11 October and 2 November 2006, agreements were signed between the Dutch government and the governments of each island that would put into effect the commission's findings by 15 December 2008. The reform took effect on 10 October 2010. Under these reforms, the Netherlands Antilles were dissolved and Curaçao and Sint Maarten became constituent countries within the Kingdom of the Netherlands, obtaining the same status as Aruba which seceded from the Netherlands Antilles in 1986.

The BES islands (i.e., Bonaire, Saba, and Sint Eustatius) became direct parts of the Netherlands, which is itself the major constituent country of the Kingdom. As special municipalities, they were constituted as "public bodies" (Dutch: openbare lichamen) under the Constitution for the Kingdom of the Netherlands. These municipalities resemble ordinary Dutch municipalities in most ways (e.g., they have mayors, aldermen, and municipal councils) and the laws of the Netherlands would operate in them. As a transitional measure, however, only Netherlands law necessary to function within its legal system took immediate effect when the BES islands joined the Netherlands on 10 October 2010, while most laws of the Netherlands Antilles remained in force. Since that date, Dutch legislation slowly replaced Netherlands Antilles laws. Nevertheless, some derogations exist: e.g., social security is not at the same level as in the European part of the Netherlands, and the islands' currency is the U.S. dollar, not the euro.

The special municipalities will be represented in the affairs of the Kingdom by the Netherlands, as they vote for the Dutch parliament. The Dutch Senate is chosen by provincial councils; however, as the BES islands are not part of any province, each elects an electoral college who then choose the Senators similarly to the provincial councils.

The Netherlands has proposed to conducted a study on the BES islands acquiring the European Union status of Outermost Regions (OMR), also called Ultra Peripheral Regions (UPR). The study would also look into how the islands would fare under UPR status.

== Distinction between the Netherlands and the Kingdom ==
Outside the Kingdom of the Netherlands, "Netherlands" is used as the English short-form name to describe the Kingdom of the Netherlands. At the United Nations, for example, the Kingdom was, until 2023, identified in the General Assembly by its English short-form name "Netherlands", whereas the English long-form name "Kingdom of the Netherlands" was used in place of the name "Netherlands" in formal UN documentation. Effective 3 March 2023, at the request of the Permanent Mission of the Kingdom of the Netherlands, the UN changed the English short form from "Netherlands" to "Netherlands (Kingdom of the)". The new form appears in the terminology database of the United Nations: UNTERM. International treaties, also, frequently shorten "Kingdom of the Netherlands" to "Netherlands". The Dutch name that is commonly used is Nederland, which is a singular form, whereas the official Dutch name Koninkrijk der Nederlanden like the English "(Kingdom of the) Netherlands", uses the plural form. In Dutch practice, however, "Kingdom of the Netherlands" is shortened to "Kingdom" and not to "Netherlands", as the latter name could be confused with the Kingdom's principal constituent country rather than with the Kingdom in its Charter capacity. (Note: Examples of this practice can be found in all government documents and in nearly all press reports on Kingdom affairs, as well as in institutions that are related to the Kingdom of the Netherlands: Raad van Ministers van het Koninkrijk ("Council of Ministers of the Kingdom"), Ministerie van Binnenlanse Zaken en Koninkrijksrelaties ("Ministry of the Interior and Kingdom Affairs"), the Koninkrijksspelen ("Kingdom Games", the Dutch equivalent of the Commonwealth Games), etc.) The Charter for the Kingdom of the Netherlands also shortens "Kingdom of the Netherlands" to "Kingdom" rather than to "Netherlands".

Apart from the fact that referring to the Kingdom of the Netherlands as the "Netherlands" can be confusing, the term "Kingdom" is also used to prevent any feelings of ill will that could be associated with the use of the term "Netherlands." The use of the term "Netherlands" for the Kingdom as a whole might imply that Aruba, Curaçao, and Sint Maarten are not equal to the Kingdom's country in Europe and that the three island countries have no say in affairs pertaining to the Kingdom but are instead subordinate to the European country. Though the influence of the islands in Kingdom affairs is limited, it certainly exists.

Talking about the negotiation tactics of then Minister for Kingdom Affairs Alexander Pechtold, ChristenUnie leader, and then demissionary Deputy Prime Minister of the Netherlands André Rouvoet illustrated the sensitivity in this matter by remarking in the House of Representatives that "[...] the old reproof that constantly characterised the relationship between the Netherlands and the Antilles immediately surfaced again. The Netherlands identifies the Kingdom with the Netherlands and dictates. The Netherlands Antilles can like it or lump it." In addition, the Werkgroep Bestuurlijke en Financiële Verhoudingen Nederlandse Antillen—the commission that explored the current constitutional reform of the Kingdom—recommended that the "identification of the Netherlands with the Kingdom needs to be eliminated". The Council of State of the Kingdom joins the commission in this by remarking that the Kingdom of the Netherlands has no telephone number, no budget and that the Council of Ministers of the Kingdom usually meets very briefly with a summary agenda. In its 2006 advice on the constitutional reform, the Council of State suggested establishing a Kingdom Secretariat to improve preparation for the Council of Ministers of the Kingdom and follow-up of its decisions.

== Geography ==
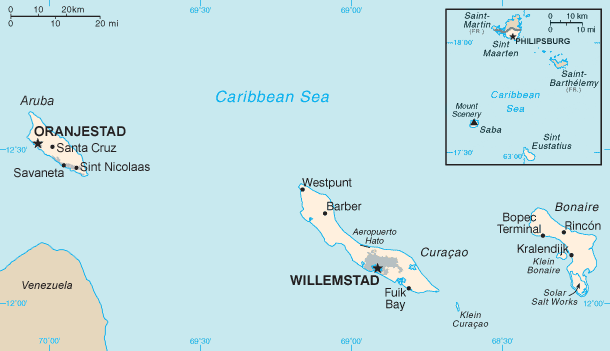
Map of the Dutch Caribbean islands, all part of the Kingdom of the Netherlands. Aruba, Curaçao and Sint Maarten are separate constituent countries within the Kingdom, whereas Bonaire, Sint Eustatius, and Saba are part of the constituent country of the Netherlands.

The Kingdom of the Netherlands covers a total area of 42,531 km^{2} (16,421 sq mi); and a land area of 34,467 km^{2} (13,308 sq mi). The Kingdom of the Netherlands has land borders with Belgium, Germany (both in the European Netherlands), and France (on Saint Martin).

About one quarter of the Netherlands lies below sea level, as much land has been reclaimed from the sea. Dikes were erected to protect the land from flooding. Previously, the highest point of the Netherlands was the Vaalserberg in Limburg at only 322.7 m (1,059 ft), but with the constitutional reform of 10 October 2010 this changed as Saba became part of the Netherlands as a special municipality, and its Mount Scenery (870 m; 2,850 ft) took the place of the Vaalserberg.

The Caribbean parts of the Kingdom consist of two zones with different geographic origins, both in the West Indies. The Leeward Islands (Saba, Sint Eustatius and Sint Maarten) are all of volcanic origin and hilly, leaving little ground suitable for agriculture. The Leeward Antilles (Aruba, Bonaire and Curaçao) are largely lacking in volcanic activity: the island arc occurs along the deformed southern edge of the Caribbean Plate and was formed by the plate's subduction under the South American Plate.

The Caribbean islands have a tropical climate, with warm weather all year round. The Leeward Islands are subject to hurricanes in the summer months. The European part of the Netherlands has a moderate maritime climate, with cool summers and mild winters.

== Timeline of constituent countries ==
Time	Countries	Changes
1954–1975	Netherlands; Netherlands Antilles; Suriname	Charter for the Kingdom of the Netherlands signed. Dutch New Guinea remained a dependent territory rather than a constituent country until 1962.
1975–1986	Netherlands; Netherlands Antilles	Suriname gained independence and became the Republic of Suriname.
1986–2010	Aruba; Netherlands; Netherlands Antilles	Aruba seceded from the Netherlands Antilles to become a constituent country in its own right.
2010–present	Aruba; Curaçao; Netherlands; Bonaire; Sint Eustatius; Saba; Sint Maarten	The Netherlands Antilles was dissolved. Curaçao and Sint Maarten became constituent countries, while the BES islands became special municipalities of the Netherlands.

== See also ==
- History of the Netherlands
- Koninkrijksdag
- Netherlands-Indonesia Union – a confederation between the Kingdom of the Netherlands and the United States of Indonesia
- West Indies Federation (1958–1962) – made up of 10 provinces of the UK
