= .an =

Internet country code top-level domain for the former Netherlands Antilles

- Logo of the University of the Netherlands Antilles, which administered the .an domain
- Introduced: 1993
- Removed: 31 July 2015
- TLD type: Country code top-level domain
- Status: Deleted (succeeded by .cw and .sx)
- Registry: University of the Netherlands Antilles
- Sponsor: University of the Netherlands Antilles
- Intended use: Entities connected with the former Netherlands Antilles
- Registration restrictions: Registrations must correspond to name or trademark of registrant; proof of identity must be shown on registration
- Structure: Registrations taken at second level and also at third level beneath some second-level labels
- Documents: Rules

.an was the Internet country code top-level domain (ccTLD) for the former Netherlands Antilles. It was administered by the University of the Netherlands Antilles. The domain was phased out after the Netherlands Antilles were dissolved in 2010. As of November 2010 the .an domain remained live with over 800 domains registered under .an, including secondary levels. On 31 July 2015, use of the domain was discontinued.

== Second level domain ==
Including google.com.an and youtube.com.an (both delegations to Google's nameservers), yahoo.com.an (delegated to Yahoo's nameservers but no A record for yahoo.com.an or www.yahoo.com.an), and visa.com.an (delegation to ultradns.net's nameservers). With the deletion of AN from the ISO 3166-1 alpha-2 register the ISO codes CW (Curaçao), SX (Sint Maarten) and BQ (Bonaire, Sint Eustatius and Saba), the ccTLDs .cw, .sx and .bq have been designated (although the last one is not in use).

== Phasing out ==
On 31 December 2013, the University of the Netherlands Antilles began removing inactive .an domain names from their databases and systems. On 31 October 2014, ICANN removed the .an domain from the DNS root servers.

== See also ==
- Internet in the Netherlands
- Internet in the Netherlands Antilles
- ISO 3166-2:AN
- .nl – ccTLD for the Netherlands
- .eu – ccTLD for the European Union
- .aw – ccTLD for Aruba
- .bq – ccTLD for the Caribbean Netherlands (Bonaire, Sint Eustatius, and Saba)
- .cw – ccTLD for Curaçao
- .sr – ccTLD for Suriname
- .sx – ccTLD for Sint Maarten, the Dutch side of the island.
