= Science and technology in the Netherlands =

Netherlands
- Flag Coat of arms

- Capital and largest city: Amsterdam (Note: Amsterdam is the constitutional capital; The Hague is the seat of the government.)
- Government seat: The Hague
- Official languages: Dutch
- ISO 3166 code: NL

Science and technology in the Netherlands has an extended history, producing many notable achievements and discoveries in the field. It is an important component in the economic and societal development of the Netherlands. The Dutch government is a driver of scientific and technological progress with science expenditure passing €4.5 billion every year.

The Netherlands is a founding member of NATO, the European Commission and its successor, the European Union. It is a small, flat country in north-western Europe with 18.5% is covered by water. Its eastern border is shared with Germany, southern border with Belgium and western and northern borders with the North Sea. The Netherlands is part of the larger Kingdom of the Netherlands (which also includes the countries of Aruba, Curacao and St Maarten as well as the territories of Bonaire, Saba and St Eustasius; all former colonies located in the Caribbean).

In this article, science is referred to as the ongoing effort to study and understand the natural world, its history and its behaviour using systematic methodology based on evidence. Technology is an application of scientific knowledge for practical purposes including processes, tools, skills and materials. It is used in collaboration with science as an instrument for solving problems and furthering human abilities.

The country was ranked the 8th most innovative nation in the world in the 2025 Global Innovation Index.

== Historical overview ==
The seventeenth century was a distinguished period for the Dutch with its powerful defence force and internationally accepted currency. In this Dutch Golden age, many Dutch scientists worked to create an intellectual boom. Being a major player in global trade, the Netherlands had a particularly broad commercial network. International traders and merchants returned with drawings and samples of flora and fauna. New data also became accessible. These factors prompted scientific research in animals and plants and instigated greater investment in scientific studies.

In the 1880s, the fall of grain prices greatly impacted Dutch society. Due to the agricultural base of the economy, government intervention was required to prevent poverty and these actions created a model for the development of science policy in the Netherlands. Scientific experiments proved a positive relationship between artificial fertiliser and soil quality, grain yield and production costs. Public and private organisations collaborated to inform Dutch farmers of this discovery based on experimental analysis. This is considered the first deliberate application of scientific research in the Netherlands. To the present day, the Dutch government is responsible for scientific research and development.

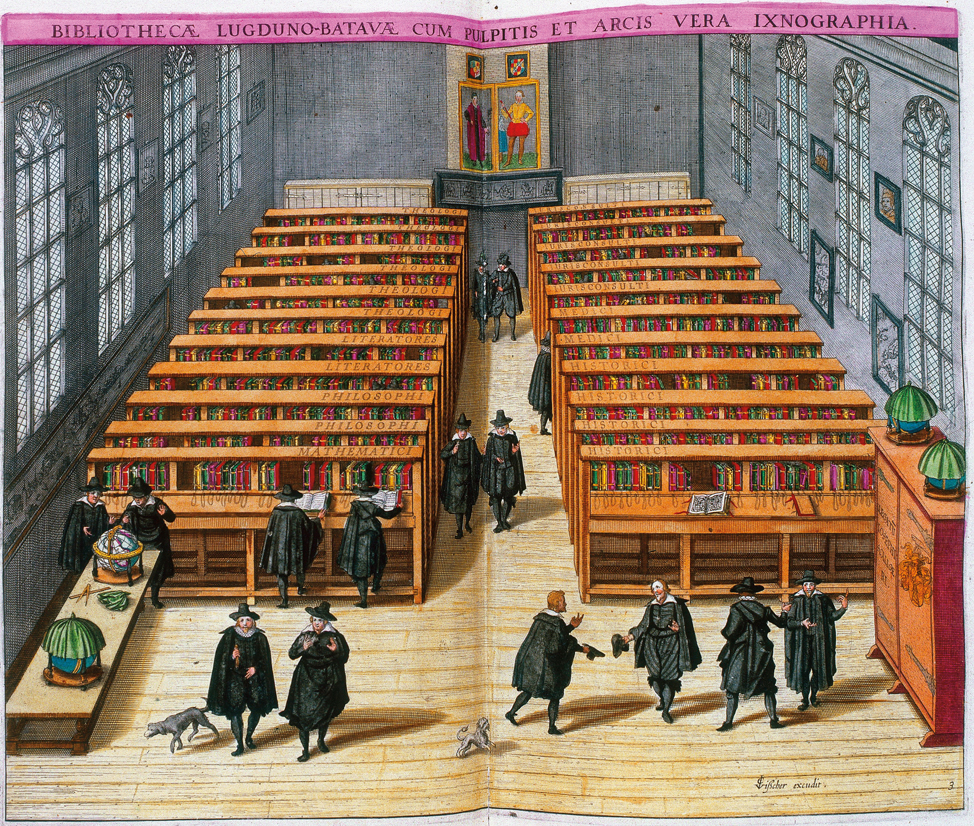
Leiden University Library (1610)

== Institutions ==
The major universities of the Netherlands including Leiden University (established 1575), the University of Franeker (established 1585) and the University of Groningen (established 1614) were the driving forces of scientific knowledge in the Netherlands as scientific societies were not created until the late eighteenth century.

Dutch scientific research is primarily organised by its universities. Research institutions occasionally conduct research and are closely linked to one or more universities.

== Scientific policy ==
Government responsibility

Science and technology is an important component in the economic and societal development of Dutch society and is therefore surrounded by government policy.

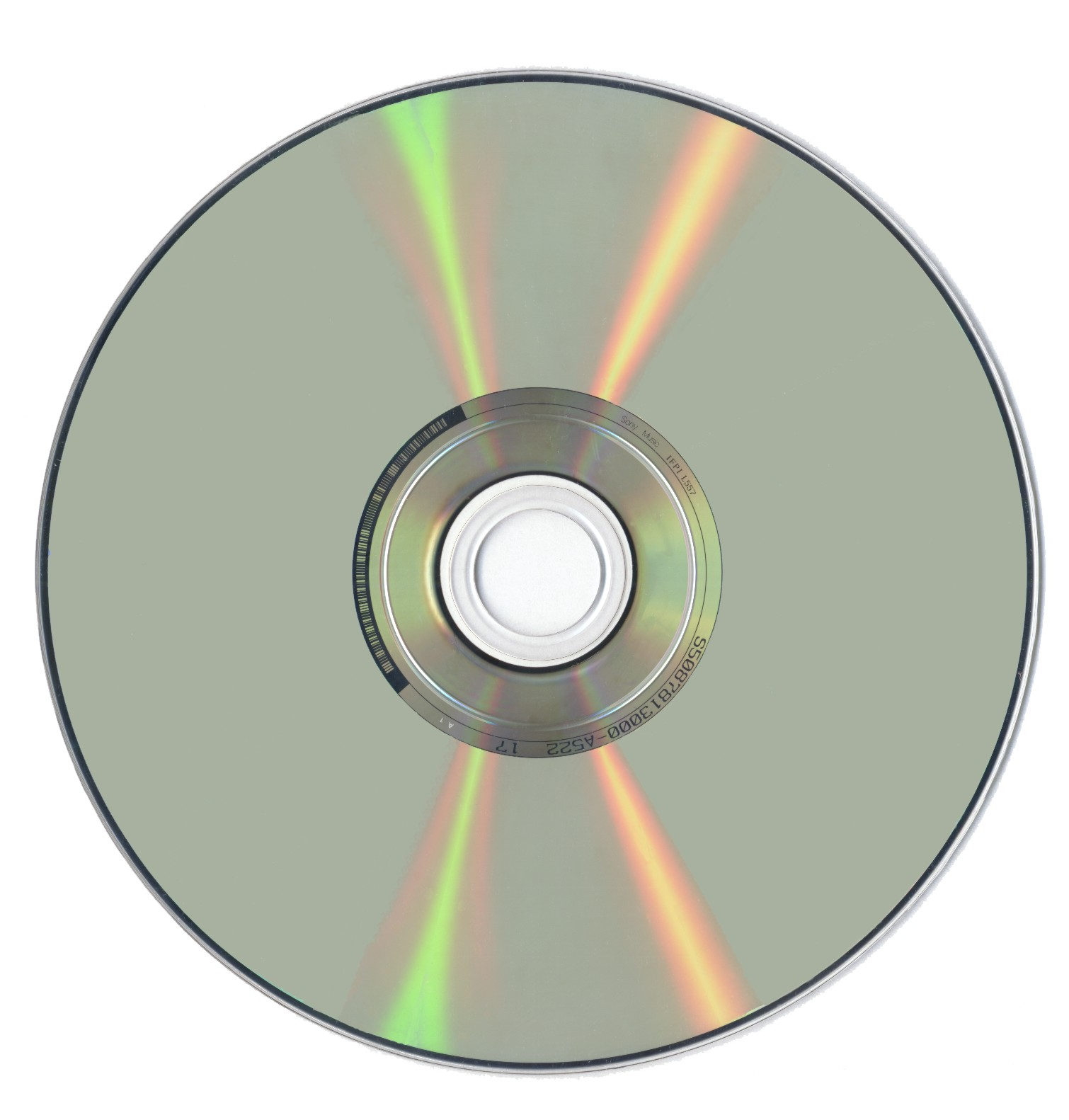
Created by Philips & Sony in the 1970s, the inner hole of a compact disc is sized to match the Dutch 10 cent coin

The Ministry of Education, Culture and Science (OCW) is the main authority in Dutch science policy. They are responsible for the Dutch higher education strategic agenda and Science Budget which are published every four years. The Ministry of Education, Culture and Science is also responsible for many research organisations including the Netherlands Organisation for Scientific Research (NWO), the Netherlands Organisation for Applied Research (TNO), the Royal Netherlands Academy of Arts and Sciences (KNAW), the Royal Library (KB) as well as the public universities.

The Ministry of Economic Affairs (EZ) controls scientific research and development policy as well as technology and innovation policy. Together, the OCW and EZ are the two most significant parties in Dutch government policy.

== Research and development ==
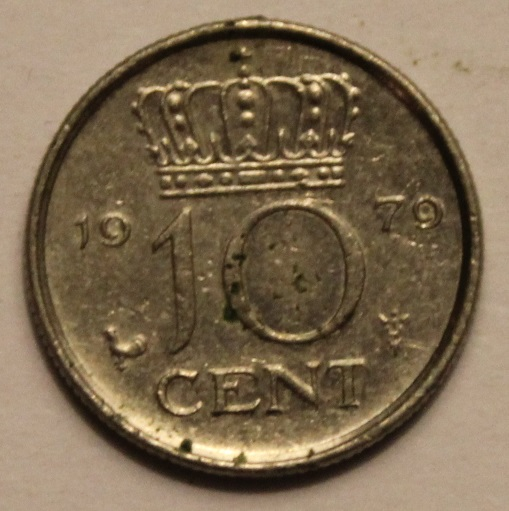
A Dutch 10 cent coin

R&D is supported by Dutch institutions, universities and industry, allowing the innovation system in the Netherlands to be highly ranked.

A 2014 Review of Innovations Policy by the OECD highlighted the success of the Netherlands in its innovation system, crediting many factors including its long-term socioeconomic performance, human resource base, integration into the global economy, developed infrastructure, performance and skills of Dutch firms, supportive business environment and the global reach of its multinational firms. Through cross-border co-publications and public-private publications, the broadness of the Dutch research network is evident.

Like many other countries, the main source of R&D funding in the Netherlands is the business sector. In 2003, firms funded a 51% share of total R&D expenditure whilst the government funded 36%. Foreign investment was the third largest source sitting at 11%. In 2004, 58% of R&D was conducted by the firms with seven companies participating in 29% of total R&D in the Netherlands. Dutch multinational Phillips, was the largest contributor, conducting one-fifth of the business sector R&D.

Another strength reported by the OECD was strong research universities and research institutions as well as great number and quality of scientific publications. The Netherlands (14.5%) is only second to the Swiss (15.7%) in the international ranking of share of research publications falling within the top 10% of most cited publications.

The OECD report also noted weaknesses including repeated changes in innovation policy, lack of recognition of the impact of science and technology within the public, entrepreneurial culture, lower tertiary education graduation rates, long-term productivity growth and low scientific research expenditure.
