= Area code 721 =

NANP area code for the country of St. Maarten (Caribbean)

Coordinates: 18.0290°N 63.0447°W

Area code 721 is the telephone area code in the North American Numbering Plan (NANP) for Sint Maarten, a constituent country of the Kingdom of the Netherlands in the Caribbean. The area code was assigned in 2011 after membership of the country in the NANP became effective. International dialing to the country requires the use of country code 1.

== History ==
Sint Maarten became a NANP member on 30 September 2011, after having been approved for membership in 2009. Previously, Sint Maarten used the country code 599, originally assigned to the now-dissolved Netherlands Antilles, and still in use by Curaçao and the Caribbean Netherlands (Bonaire, Sint Eustatius, and Saba). The northern French side of the island, known as Saint-Martin, does not use the North American Numbering Plan, and has the country code +590, shared with Guadeloupe and Saint Barthélemy. Calls between the two parts of the island require international dialling procedures.

On July 27, 2011, the North American Numbering Plan Administrator (NANPA) granted the issuance of the area code to Sint Maarten. Implementation dates were set for September 30, 2011, when a permissive dialing period commenced until September 30, 2012, during which calls to the country were possible using country code 599 or the new NANP prefix 1-721.

== Calling procedure ==
Callers from outside the NANP, including callers from the French side of the island, must dial the international access code (often 00) followed by 1 721. Callers within the NANP dial 1 721 and the seven-digit local telephone number. Call within the country are established with seven-digit dialing of the local telephone number.

== Previous country code ==
After St. Maarten's migration to the NANP, the remaining territories of the former Netherlands Antilles (Curaçao and the Caribbean Netherlands) have retained country code 599.

== See also ==
- List of NANP area codes
- Area codes in the Caribbean
- Telephone numbers in Aruba
- Telephone numbers in Curaçao and the Caribbean Netherlands
- Telephone numbers in the Netherlands
