= .cw =

Top-level Internet domain for Curaçao

- Introduced: 20 December 2010
- TLD type: Country code top-level domain
- Status: Active
- Registry: .CW Registry Curacao (CW DomReg)
- Sponsor: University of Curaçao
- Intended use: Entities connected with Curaçao
- Actual use: Mainly in Curaçao
- Registered domains: 973 (2021-11-12)
- Registration restrictions: .cw requires local presence. .com.cw and .net.cw do not require local presence.
- Registry website: University of Curaçao

.cw is the Internet country code top-level domain (ccTLD) for Curaçao.

== History ==
The domain was created following the decision on December 15, 2010 by the ISO 3166 Maintenance Agency to allocate CW as the ISO 3166-1 alpha-2 code for Curaçao.

This decision followed Curaçao's new status as an autonomous country within the Kingdom of the Netherlands on October 10, 2010.

The University of Curaçao, which already was the sponsor for .an was designated as the sponsoring organization.

== Registration ==
Registration of .cw domains was available from 1 February 2012.

Previously, many websites in Curaçao used the former Netherlands Antilles's ccTLD, .an. Domains from .an were able to switch to .sx (Sint Maarten) or .cw, depending on where they are based.

== See also ==
- Internet in the Netherlands
- .nl
- .sx
