= .sx =

Internet country code top-level domain for Sint Maarten

- Introduced: 20 December 2010
- TLD type: Country code top-level domain
- Status: Active
- Registry: SX Registry SA B.V. (operated by Canadian Internet Registration Authority)
- Sponsor: SX Registry SA B.V.
- Intended use: Entities connected with Sint Maarten and for others
- Actual use: Gets some use in Sint Maarten.
- Registration restrictions: Local presence on the island is not required
- Dispute policies: UDRP
- Registry website: http://registry.sx/

.sx is the country code top-level domain (ccTLD) in the Domain Name System of the Internet for Sint Maarten.

Sint Maarten became an autonomous country within the Kingdom of the Netherlands on 10 October 2010. On 15 December 2010, the ISO 3166 Maintenance Agency allocated SX as the ISO 3166-1 alpha-2 code for Sint Maarten, as other possible combinations such as .sm, .ma, and .mt had already been allocated.

The sx top-level domain is run on the CIRA Fury Registry Platform. Registrars of sx domains must be accredited by the registry.

After an initial sunrise period to claim trademarked names, and registration periods for local priority, and landrush assignments the registry opened general availability registrations to the public on 15 November 2012. A local presence is not required of domain name registrants.

== Registration phases ==
- Grandfather period to protect Sint Maarten holders of AN domain names ended 2 May 2012.
- Sunrise period to protect trademark holders was conducted from 3 May to 4 July 2012.
- Local Sint Maarten corporate and personal priority periods were from 5 July to 4 September 2012.
- Landrush period was from 5 September to 4 October 2012.
- General availability period during which anyone may register a SX domain name started 15 November 2012

== See also ==
- Internet in the Netherlands
- Internet in the Netherlands Antilles
- ISO 3166-2:SX
- .nl –CC TLD for the Netherlands
- .an –CC TLD for former Netherlands Antilles federation
- .eu –CC TLD for the European Union
- .mf, the ccTLD proposed for Saint Martin, the French side of the island.
