= .bq =

Internet country code top-level domain for Bonaire, Sint Eustatius and Saba

- Introduced: 20 February 2010
- TLD type: Country code top-level domain
- Status: Unassigned
- Registry: None
- Sponsor: None
- Intended use: Entities connected with Caribbean Netherlands
- Actual use: Not available for use
- Registration restrictions: Not available for registration

.bq is designated—but not in use—as the Internet country code top-level domain (ccTLD) for Bonaire, Sint Eustatius and Saba (the Caribbean Netherlands) following the assignment on December 15, 2010, by the ISO 3166 Maintenance Agency of BQ as the ISO 3166-1 alpha-2 to the area. This decision followed the dissolution of the Netherlands Antilles and new status of the Caribbean Netherlands as public bodies of the Netherlands on October 10, 2010.

Previously, the Caribbean Netherlands used the former Netherlands Antilles's ccTLD, .an, which has been phased out in July 2015. As part of the Netherlands proper, .nl also applies. Use of the top level domain is as of July 2015 being considered and an economic evaluation is being performed to that effect.

BQ was chosen as other possible codes had already been allocated.

== See also ==
- Internet in the Netherlands Antilles
- Internet in the Netherlands
- .an
