= Telephone numbers in the Netherlands =

Telephone numbers in Netherlands
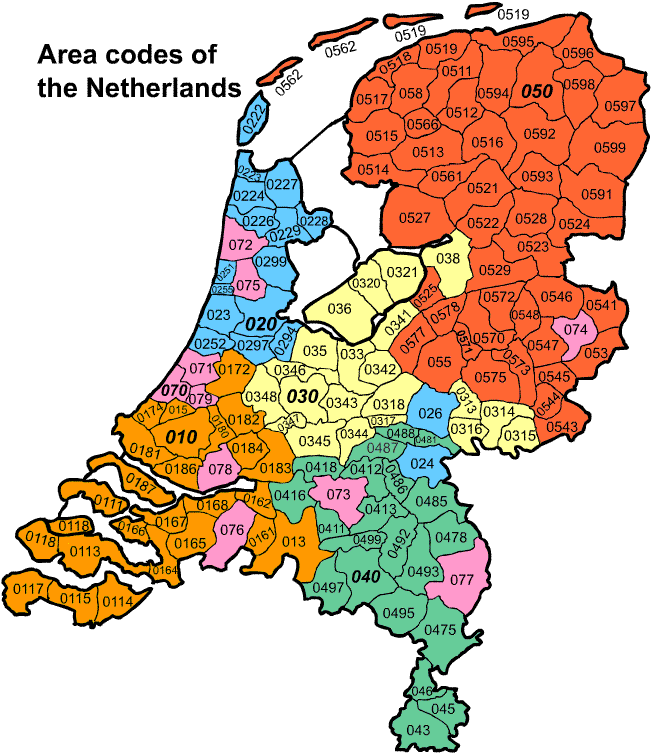
- Map of telephone codes
- Country: Netherlands
- Continent: Europe
- Numbering plan type: Closed
- NSN length: 9
- Format: 0xx xxx xx xx / 0xxx xx xx xx (geographical); 06 xx xx xx xx (mobile)
- Country code: 31
- International access: 00
- Long-distance: 0

Telephone numbers in the Netherlands are administered by the Ministry of Economic Affairs, Agriculture and Innovation of the Netherlands. The telephone numbering plan may be grouped into three general categories: geographical numbers, non-geographical numbers, and numbers for public services.

Geographical telephone numbers have nine digits and consist of an area code of two or three digits and a subscriber number of seven or six digits, respectively. When dialled within the country, the number must be prefixed with the trunk access code 0, identifying a destination telephone line in the Dutch telephone network.

Non-geographical numbers have no fixed length, but also require the dialling of the trunk access code (0). They are used for mobile telephone networks and other designated service types, such as toll-free dialling, Internet access, voice over IP, restricted audiences, and information resources.

In addition, special service numbers exist for emergency response, directory assistance, and other services by the public authorities.

== Numbering plan ==
The telephone numbering plan of the Netherlands is divided into geographical, non-geographical, and special public resource telephone numbers. The dial plan prescribes that within the country dialling both geographical and non-geographical numbers requires a national network access code, which is the digit 0. The following list includes this national trunk access digit when it must be dialled before the number.

Access digits	Description
01x(x) to 05x(x)	Geographical area codes
061 to 065	Mobile phones
066	Mobile pagers
0670 to 0675	Videotex
0676	Internet access number
068	Mobile phones
07x	Geographical area codes
0800	Toll free number
082	Virtual private networks
084	Location independent, premium rate (used mostly for fax-to-email and voicemail services)
085	Location independent, basic rate (for private use) VoIP telephony
087	Location independent, premium rate
088	Location independent, basic rate (for companies)
091	VoIP telephony
097	Location independent, machine to machine
0900	Premium rate, information
0906	Premium rate, adult content
0909	Premium rate, entertainment
112	Emergency services
113	Stichting 113Online Suicide Prevention
1233	Voicemail
14xx(xx)	Public authorities, where xxxx is the two-, three- or four-digit area-code of the municipality
16xx	Carrier select prefixes
18xx	Number information

066, 084 and 087 are often used by scammers, because they are easy and cheap to register and make identification very hard.

Previously, 06-0, 06-1000 and 06-4 were used for toll-free numbers, 06-8 for shared cost, 06-9 for premium rate, and other 06-numbers for mobile numbers. 0011 and later 06-11 was used for emergency services before this changed to 112. 09 was used as the international access code before this changed to 00.

== Geographical telephone numbers ==
Since the reorganization of the telephone system in 1995, Dutch geographical numbers consist of 9 digits. The numbering plan implements a system of area codes. An area code consists of two or three digits. The larger cities and areas have two digits with a subscriber number of seven digits, permitting more local numbers. Smaller areas use three digits with a six-digit subscriber number.

Geographic numbers are allocated in blocks to telecommunications providers. However, a telephone number from a block allocated to a certain provider may no longer be serviced by the original assignee due to number portability; subscribers who switch providers can take their number with them.

When dialled within the Netherlands, the domestic trunk access code 0 must be dialled before the telephone number, extending the dialling sequence to 10 digits. If dialling from abroad, the 0 (Zero) in front of the prefix must be omitted.

Before the 1995 reorganization, area codes were restricted to towns. This was lifted and multiple towns may now share an area code. The following table lists only one town for each area code, and it includes the trunk access code (0).

010 Rotterdam
0111 Zierikzee
0113 Goes
0114 Hulst
0115 Terneuzen
0117 Sluis
0118 Middelburg / Vlissingen
013 Tilburg
015 Delft
0161 Gilze-Rijen
0162 Oosterhout
0164 Bergen op Zoom
0165 Roosendaal
0166 Tholen
0167 Steenbergen
0168 Zevenbergen
0172 Alphen aan den Rijn
0174 Naaldwijk
0180 Ridderkerk and Zuidplas
0181 Spijkenisse
0182 Gouda
0183 Gorinchem
0184 Sliedrecht
0186 Oud-Beijerland
0187 Middelharnis
020 Amsterdam
0222 Texel
0223 Den Helder
0224 Schagen
0226 Harenkarspel
0227 Medemblik
0228 Enkhuizen
0229 Hoorn
023 Haarlem
024 Nijmegen
0251 Beverwijk
0252 Hillegom
0255 IJmuiden
026 Arnhem
0294 Weesp
0297 Aalsmeer
0299 Purmerend
030 Utrecht
0313 Dieren
0314 Doetinchem
0315 Terborg
0316 Zevenaar
0317 Wageningen
0318 Ede / Veenendaal
0320 Lelystad
0321 Dronten
033 Amersfoort
0341 Harderwijk
0342 Barneveld
0343 Doorn
0344 Tiel
0345 Culemborg
0346 Maarssen
0347 Vianen
0348 Woerden
035 Hilversum
036 Almere
038 Zwolle
040 Eindhoven
0411 Boxtel
0412 Oss
0413 Veghel
0416 Waalwijk
0418 Zaltbommel
043 Maastricht
045 Heerlen
046 Sittard
0475 Roermond
0478 Venray
0481 Bemmel
0485 Cuijk
0486 Grave
0487 Druten
0488 Zetten
0492 Helmond
0493 Deurne
0495 Weert
0497 Eersel
0499 Best
050 Groningen
0511 Veenwouden
0512 Drachten
0513 Heerenveen
0514 Balk
0515 Sneek
0516 Oosterwolde
0517 Franeker
0518 St. Annaparochie
0519 Dokkum
0521 Steenwijk
0522 Meppel
0523 Hardenberg
0524 Coevorden
0525 Elburg
0527 Emmeloord
0528 Hoogeveen
0529 Ommen
053 Enschede
0541 Oldenzaal
0543 Winterswijk
0544 Groenlo
0545 Neede
0546 Almelo
0547 Goor
0548 Rijssen
055 Apeldoorn
0561 Wolvega
0562 Terschelling/Vlieland
0566 Irnsum
0570 Deventer
0571 Voorst
0572 Raalte
0573 Lochem
0575 Zutphen
0577 Uddel
0578 Epe
058 Leeuwarden
0591 Emmen
0592 Assen
0593 Beilen
0594 Zuidhorn
0595 Warffum
0596 Appingedam
0597 Winschoten
0598 Hoogezand-Sappemeer
0599 Stadskanaal
070 The Hague
071 Leiden
072 Alkmaar
073 's-Hertogenbosch
074 Hengelo
075 Zaandam
076 Breda
077 Venlo
078 Dordrecht
079 Zoetermeer

== Non-geographical telephone numbers ==
The non-geographic numbers do not have a prescribed fixed number of digits, but are usually kept as short as possible. Mobile telephone numbers, however, always have 10 digits, just like geographic numbers.

The non-geographical telephone number categories are, including the trunk access code:

- 06: mobile telephone operators,
- 0800: free service numbers,
- 084, 085: used for VoIP
- 087: voicemail and virtual private numbers
- 088: large companies with more than one address
- 0970: machine to machine communication, numbers are 8-11 digits long
- 0979: machine to machine communication, numbers have no fixed length and are reserved for network internal usage
- 0900: paid information services
- 0906: adult lines
- 0909: entertainment

Toll-free numbers (0800) can always be dialled for free, even from (public) payphones; other numbers starting with 08 are not free.

== Public resources ==
The emergency number is 112. GSM mobile phones may accept different numbers, such as 999, 000 or 911, depending on the firmware. Additionally, calls to 911 are forwarded to 112 (in the Caribbean Netherlands, this is reversed - 112 redirects to 911 in that case).

Directory assistance is available from several commercial providers, on 18xx (e.g., 1888 from KPN).

== Caribbean Netherlands ==
The islands of Bonaire, Sint Eustatius and Saba, which form the Caribbean Netherlands after the dissolution of the Netherlands Antilles, retained the numbering plan of the Netherlands Antilles using country code +599, followed by 7, 3 or 4 for Bonaire, Sint Eustatius or Saba, respectively. Calls between the European Netherlands and Caribbean Netherlands are billed as international calls.

== See also ==
- Communications in the Netherlands
- Telephone numbers in Aruba
- Telephone numbers in Sint Maarten (NANP)
