= Telecommunications in the Netherlands =

This article is intended to give an overview of telecommunications in the Netherlands.

== Mail ==
The postal service in the Netherlands is performed by PostNL in most cases—which has, as of 2008, a monopoly on letters lighter than 50 g. The monopoly is planned to expire in 2009. PostNL's competitors include Selekt Mail and Sandd. Post offices that are owned by Postbank and TNT Post have been earmarked for closure between 2008 and 2013.

Postal codes in the Netherlands are formed of four digits then two letters (in capitals), separated by a space—1234 AB, for example.

== Telephone ==
Telephones - main lines in use: 8,000,000 (2007)

Telephones - mobile cellular subscribers: 17,200,000 (2007)

Telephone system: general assessment: highly developed and well maintained

domestic: extensive fixed-line fiber-optic network; cellular telephone system is one of the largest in Europe with three major network operators utilizing the third generation of the Global System for Mobile Communications (GSM).

international: 9 submarine cables; satellite earth stations - 3 Intelsat (1 Indian Ocean and 2 Atlantic Ocean), 1 Eutelsat, and 1 Inmarsat (Atlantic and Indian Ocean regions) (2004)

=== Area codes ===
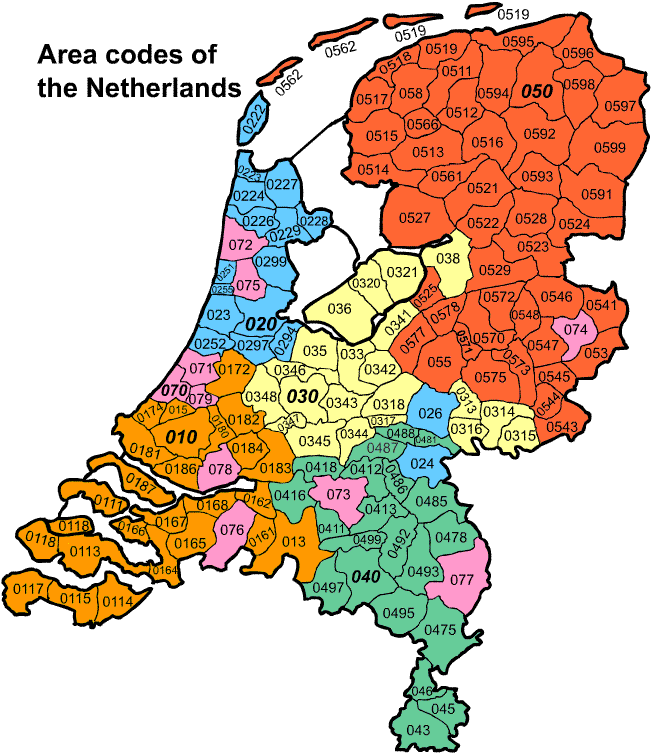
Orange: Codes starting with 01 Blue: Codes starting with 02 Yellow: Codes starting with 03 Green: Codes starting with 04 Red: Codes starting with 05 Purple: Codes starting with 07

- 010 – Rotterdam
- 0111 – Zierikzee
- 0113 – Goes
- 0114 – Hulst
- 0115 – Terneuzen
- 0117 – Oostburg
- 0118 – Middelburg
- 013 – Tilburg
- 015 – Delft
- 0161 – Rijen
- 0162 – Oosterhout
- 0164 – Bergen op Zoom
- 0165 – Roosendaal
- 0166 – Tholen
- 0167 – Steenbergen
- 0168 – Zevenbergen
- 0172 – Alphen aan den Rijn
- 0174 – Naaldwijk
- 0180 – Ridderkerk
- 0181 – Spijkenisse
- 0182 – Gouda
- 0183 – Gorinchem
- 0184 – Sliedrecht
- 0186 – Oud-Beijerland
- 0187 – Middelharnis
- 020 – Amsterdam
- 0222 – Texel
- 0223 – Den Helder
- 0224 – Schagen
- 0226 – Noord-Scharwoude
- 0227 – Middenmeer
- 0228 – Enkhuizen
- 0229 – Hoorn
- 023 – Haarlem
- 024 – Nijmegen
- 0251 – Beverwijk
- 0252 – Hillegom
- 0255 – IJmuiden
- 026 – Arnhem
- 0294 – Weesp
- 0297 – Aalsmeer
- 0299 – Purmerend
- 030 – Utrecht
- 0313 – Dieren
- 0314 – Doetinchem
- 0315 – Terborg
- 0316 – Zevenaar
- 0317 – Wageningen
- 0318 – Ede
- 0320 – Lelystad
- 0321 – Dronten
- 033 – Amersfoort
- 0341 – Harderwijk
- 0342 – Barneveld
- 0343 – Doorn
- 0344 – Tiel
- 0345 – Culemborg
- 0346 – Maarssen
- 0347 – Vianen
- 0348 – Woerden
- 035 – Hilversum
- 036 – Almere
- 038 – Zwolle
- 040 – Eindhoven
- 0411 – Boxtel
- 0412 – Oss
- 0413 – Veghel
- 0416 – Waalwijk
- 0418 – Zaltbommel
- 043 – Maastricht
- 045 – Heerlen
- 046 – Sittard
- 0475 – Roermond
- 0478 – Venray
- 0481 – Bemmel
- 0485 – Cuijk
- 0486 – Grave
- 0487 – Druten
- 0488 – Zetten
- 0492 – Helmond
- 0493 – Deurne
- 0495 – Weert
- 0497 – Reusel
- 0499 – Best
- 050 – Groningen
- 0511 – Veenwouden
- 0512 – Drachten
- 0513 – Heerenveen
- 0514 – Balk
- 0515 – Sneek
- 0516 – Oosterwolde
- 0517 – Franeker
- 0518 – St. Annaparochie
- 0519 – Dokkum
- 0521 – Steenwijk
- 0522 – Meppel
- 0523 – Dedemsvaart
- 0524 – Coevorden
- 0525 – Elburg
- 0527 – Emmeloord
- 0528 – Hoogeveen
- 0529 – Ommen
- 053 – Enschede
- 0541 – Oldenzaal
- 0543 – Winterswijk
- 0544 – Groenlo/Lichtenvoorde
- 0545 – Neede
- 0546 – Almelo
- 0547 – Goor
- 0548 – Rijssen
- 055 – Apeldoorn
- 0561 – Wolvega
- 0562 – Terschelling/Vlieland
- 0566 – Irnsum
- 0570 – Deventer
- 0571 – Voorst
- 0572 – Raalte
- 0573 – Lochem
- 0575 – Zutphen
- 0577 – Uddel
- 0578 – Epe
- 058 – Leeuwarden
- 0591 – Emmen
- 0592 – Assen
- 0593 – Beilen
- 0594 – Zuidhorn
- 0595 – Warffum
- 0596 – Appingedam
- 0597 – Winschoten
- 0598 – Hoogezand
- 0599 – Stadskanaal
- 070 – The Hague
- 071 – Leiden
- 072 – Alkmaar
- 073 – 's-Hertogenbosch
- 074 – Hengelo
- 075 – Zaandam
- 076 – Breda
- 077 – Venlo
- 078 – Dordrecht
- 079 – Zoetermeer

=== Non-geographical codes ===
Starting with

- 06 - Mobile/Cell phones
- 066 - Pager numbers
- 0676 - Internet service provider dial-up line
- 0800 - Free service numbers
- 084 - Non-geographical personal numbers
- 085 - VoIP numbers
- 087 - Non-geographical personal numbers (also for VoIP use)
- 088 - Large companies with more than one address
- 0900 - Paid information numbers
- 0906 - Adult lines
- 0909 - Entertainment
- 091 - VoIP numbers (not yet in use)

== Radio, television and internet ==
Radio broadcast stations: AM 4, FM 58, shortwave 3 (1998)

Radios: 15.3 million (1996)

Television broadcast stations: 25

Televisions: 6,700,000 (2002, CBS)

Internet service providers (ISPs): 33 (2007)

Country code (Top level domain): .nl

== Countries and Special municipalities ==
- Telecommunications in Aruba
- Telecommunications in the Caribbean Netherlands (Bonaire · Saba · Sint Eustatius)
- Telecommunications in Curaçao
- Telecommunications in Sint Maarten
- Telecommunications in the Netherlands Antilles (Defunct)
