= Telephone numbers in Curaçao and the Caribbean Netherlands =

Country code 599 was assigned to the Netherlands Antilles (dissolved in 2010), and is in use by Curaçao and the Caribbean Netherlands (Bonaire, Sint Eustatius, and Saba).

Aruba and Sint Maarten, also former parts of the Netherlands Antilles, discontinued using the code in 1986 and 2011 respectively. Aruba uses country code 297, and Sint Maarten joined the North American Numbering Plan (NANP) with area code 721.

The International call prefix is 00.

== Area codes ==
Originally each island had an area code with the length of the local numbering varying from island to island (Curaçao had six while Bonaire had only four). Beginning in 1999, the numbers were modified so that each local number was seven digits long. This change left the islands without any area codes, except for Curaçao, which has the area code of 9 along with the seven digit local number.

== Sint Maarten joined NANP ==
On September 30, 2009, the North American Numbering Plan Administration (NANPA) approved the request of Sint Maarten's government to join the NANP with area code 721. Effective 30 September 2011, Sint Maarten's country code changed to the NANP code of 1. A permissive dialing period of one full year (to 30 September 2012) was in place when dialing 1721 or country code 599 could be used.

== Historic list of area codes and number ranges ==
Island	Number range
Bonaire	7xx xxxx 717 xxxx (Telbo); 750 xxxx (Flamingo TV); 700 xxxx (Mobile); 701 xxxx (Mobile); 795 xxxx (Mobile); 796 5xxx (Mobile)
Curaçao (Area code 9)	9 4xx xxxx 9 5xx xxxx (mobile); 9 6xx xxxx (mobile); 9 7xx xxxx 9 8xx xxxx
Sint Maarten (before joining NANP)	5xx xxxx
Saba	416xxxx
Sint Eustatius	3xx xxxx
Aruba (until secession)	8xx xxxx
Non-geographic	1xx xxxx 6xx xxxx

== See also ==
- Telephone numbers in Aruba
- Telephone numbers in the Netherlands
