= Bicentennial of the Kingdom of the Netherlands =

From 2013 to 2015, the Kingdom of the Netherlands celebrated its bicentennial.

== Events and publications ==
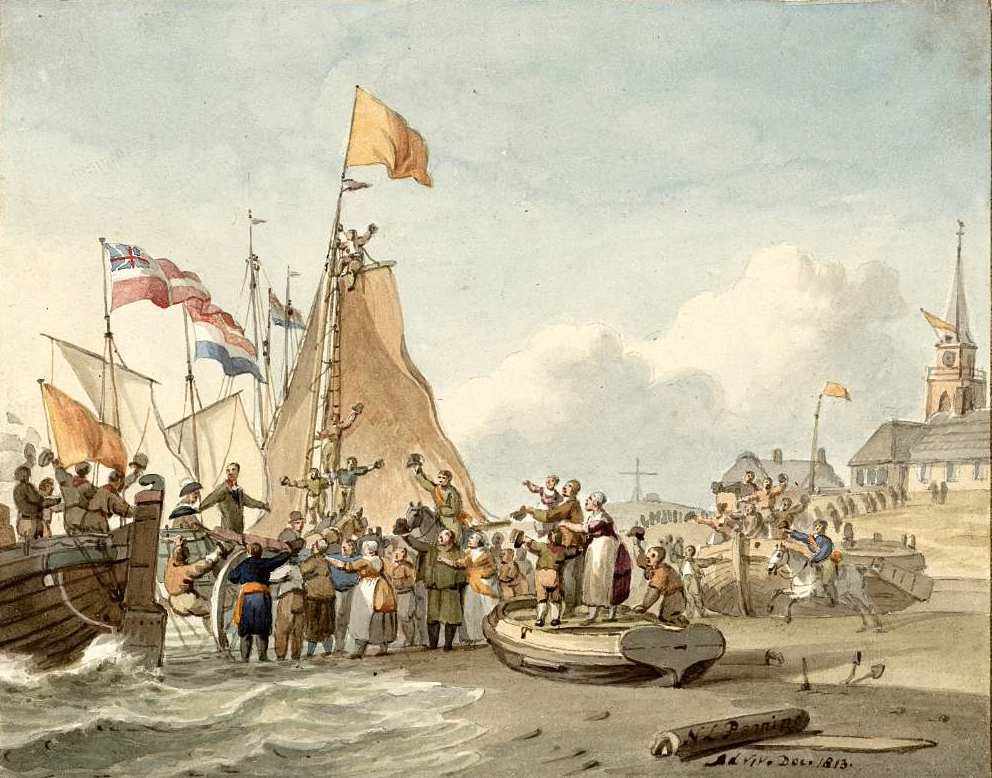
Landing of William Frederick at Scheveningen, 1813

A National Committee, appointed by the Council of Ministers in 2011, supervised the bicentennial celebrations. The Committee was chaired by politicians Ank Bijleveld and Jozias van Aartsen.

The celebrations started with a reenactment on 30 November 2013 of Prince William Frederick's landing at Scheveningen, exactly two hundred years earlier, with Huub Stapel playing the role of William Frederick, later King William I. The reenactment (which is performed every 25 years) drew a crowd of several thousand.

Five more "national events" were planned, the last of which took place in Amsterdam on 26 September 2015; the bicentennial's official website promised "a spectacular parade of achievements" on the Amstel.

Aside from the official celebrations, new biographies of the first three kings (William I, II and III) were published, revealing the existence of an illegitimate child of William I and some homosexual affairs of William II.

== Reception ==
Several Dutch historians and journalists have criticized the bicentennial's motto of "200 years of independence and democracy". NOS reporter Piet van Asseldonk questioned whether the country can celebrate two hundred years of kingship (given the Kingdom of Holland's foundation in 1806), or two hundred years of independence (already achieved by the Eighty Years' War which ended in 1648), or two hundred years of Orange rule (the dynasty had been Stadtholders for much longer), or two hundred years of democracy (since the early kings were not democrats), and concluded that the theme was ambiguous and not very attractive.

Similarly, historian Coos Huijsen stated that the celebrations "omitted half the story" by letting Dutch history start in 1813, rather than with the "struggle for freedom" of the late 16th century, arguing that Napoleon's defeat was hardly to the merit of the Dutch. Historian/journalist Marnix Koolhaas, writing on an NPO website, called the founding event—William I's return—"a common coup d'état", while the Dutch monarchy was a Napoleonic invention, established in 1806.

Comedian Arjen Lubach used the occasion of the bicentennial to protest against the Dutch monarchy, offering to become "Pharaoh of the Netherlands" in his television show Zondag met Lubach (22 March 2015). He started a citizens' initiative, a petition that obliges the Dutch parliament to discuss a proposal if supported by more than 40,000 citizens, and obtained the required number of signatures within a day.

== Earlier celebrations ==
Earlier anniversaries were celebrated in 1863 (construction of a monument for William I, which was renovated in 2004 for the bicentennial), 1913, 1933, 1963 and 1988.
