= ISO 3166-2:BQ =

Entry for Bonaire, Sint Eustatius and Saba in ISO 3166-2

ISO 3166-2:BQ is the entry for Bonaire, Sint Eustatius and Saba in ISO 3166-2, part of the ISO 3166 standard published by the International Organization for Standardization (ISO), which defines codes for the names of the principal subdivisions (e.g., provinces or states) of all countries coded in ISO 3166-1.

Currently for Bonaire, Sint Eustatius and Saba, special municipalities of the Netherlands, ISO 3166-2 codes are defined for three special municipalities.

Each code consists of two parts, separated by a hyphen. The first part is BQ, the ISO 3166-1 alpha-2 code of Bonaire, Sint Eustatius and Saba. The second part is two letters.

Each special municipality is also assigned their own ISO 3166-2 code under the entry for the Netherlands.

== Current codes ==
Subdivision names are listed as in the ISO 3166-2 standard published by the ISO 3166 Maintenance Agency (ISO 3166/MA).

Click on the button in the header to sort each column.

Code	Subdivision name (en), (nl)	Subdivision name (pap)	Netherlands ISO 3166-2 code
BQ-BO	Bonaire	Boneiru	NL-BQ1
BQ-SA	Saba	Saba	NL-BQ2
BQ-SE	Sint Eustatius	Sint Eustatius	NL-BQ3

== Changes ==
The following changes to the entry had been announced in newsletters by the ISO 3166/MA since the first publication of ISO 3166-2 in 1998:

Newsletter	Date issued	Description of change in newsletter
Newsletter II-3	2011-12-13 (corrected 2011-12-15)	Addition of code to align ISO 3166-1 and ISO 3166-2, addition of two divisions and update of the number of divisions.
