= Telephone numbers in Aruba =

- Country: Aruba
- Continent: South America
- Format: +297 NNX XXXX
- Country code: +297
- International access: 00

Telephone numbers in Aruba have country code 297. It is one of the few countries outside Africa to have a country code starting with 2. Before Aruba seceded from the Netherlands Antilles in 1986, it was part of the Netherlands Antilles numbering plan (+599) with phone numbers starting with +599 8. Landline numbers begin with 28, 52 or 58. Mobile numbers begin with a 56, 59, 64, 73, 74 or 99. Numbers are seven digits long, otherwise in line with the North American Numbering Plan, despite not being part of it.

| Island | Number range |
|---|---|
| Aruba (until secession) | (+599) 8xx xxxx |
| Aruba (after secession) | (+297) 28x xxxx (landline) |
| Aruba (after secession) | (+297) 52x xxxx (landline) |
| Aruba (after secession) | (+297) 58x xxxx (landline) |
| Aruba (after secession) | (+297) 56x xxxx (mobile) |
| Aruba (after secession) | (+297) 59x xxxx (mobile) |
| Aruba (after secession) | (+297) 64x xxxx (mobile) |
| Aruba (after secession) | (+297) 73x xxxx (mobile) |
| Aruba (after secession) | (+297) 74x xxxx (mobile) |
| Aruba (after secession) | (+297) 99x xxxx (mobile) |

== See also ==
- Telephone numbers in the Netherlands
- Telephone numbers in Curaçao and the Caribbean Netherlands
- Telephone numbers in Sint Maarten (NANP)
