= ISO 3166-2:NL =

Entry for the Netherlands in ISO 3166-2

ISO 3166-2:NL is the entry for the Kingdom of the Netherlands in ISO 3166-2, part of the ISO 3166 standard published by the International Organization for Standardization (ISO), which defines codes for the names of the principal subdivisions (e.g., provinces or states) of all countries coded in ISO 3166-1.

Currently for the kingdom, ISO 3166-2 codes are defined for three countries, 12 provinces and three special municipalities.

The kingdom consists of the three countries and the country of the Netherlands which is composed of the provinces and the special municipalities.

Each code consists of two parts separated by a hyphen. The first part is NL, the ISO 3166-1 alpha-2 code of the Netherlands. The second part either of the following:

- two letters: provinces or countries
- two letters and a digit: special municipalities

== Current codes ==
Subdivision names are listed as in the ISO 3166-2 standard published by the ISO 3166 Maintenance Agency (ISO 3166/MA).

ISO 639-1 codes are used to represent subdivision names in the following administrative languages:

- (nl): Dutch
- (fy): West Frisian

=== Provinces ===
Code	Subdivision Name (nl)	Subdivision Name (en) (Note: For reference only, English name not included in the ISO 3166-2 standard.)
NL-DR	Drenthe	Drenthe
NL-FL	Flevoland	Flevoland
NL-FR	Fryslân (fy)	Friesland
NL-GE	Gelderland	Gelderland
NL-GR	Groningen	Groningen
NL-LI	Limburg	Limburg
NL-NB	Noord-Brabant	North Brabant
NL-NH	Noord-Holland	North Holland
NL-OV	Overijssel	Overijssel
NL-UT	Utrecht	Utrecht
NL-ZE	Zeeland	Zeeland
NL-ZH	Zuid-Holland	South Holland

=== Countries and special municipalities ===
Besides being included as subdivisions of the Netherlands in ISO 3166-2, the countries and special municipalities are also officially assigned their own country codes in ISO 3166-1.

Code	Subdivision name (nl)	Subdivision category	ISO 3166-1 alpha-2	Alternative ISO 3166-2
NL-AW	Aruba	country	AW	
NL-CW	Curaçao	country	CW	
NL-SX	Sint Maarten	country	SX	
NL-BQ1	Bonaire	special municipality	BQ	BQ-BO
NL-BQ2	Saba	special municipality	BQ	BQ-SA
NL-BQ3	Sint Eustatius	special municipality	BQ	BQ-SE

== Changes ==
The following changes to the entry have been announced in newsletters by the ISO 3166/MA since the first publication of ISO 3166-2 in 1998:

Newsletter	Date issued	Description of change in newsletter	Code/Subdivision change
Newsletter II-3	2011-12-13 (corrected 2011-12-15)	Update resulting from the addition of the administrative readjustment and source list update.	Subdivisions added: 3 countries 3 special municipalities

== See also ==
- Subdivisions of the Netherlands
- FIPS region codes of the Netherlands
- NUTS codes of the Netherlands
- Neighbouring countries: BE, DE, FR (MF, via SX)
