= Internet in the Netherlands =

According to research done by the Organisation for Economic Co-operation and Development (OECD), the Netherlands is ranked with Switzerland in having the most broadband subscriptions per 100 inhabitants, has no bandwidth caps, and has the most homes passed in Europe in terms of connection speeds of 50 Mbit/s and higher.

In the Digital Economy and Society Index (DESI) 2022 report, the Netherlands ranks third among 27 EU countries. It performs strongly in digital proficiency, with 79% of its population possessing basic digital skills, surpassing the EU average of 54%. The nation's connectivity infrastructure is robust, with 97% fixed broadband and 94% mobile broadband coverage, both exceeding EU averages of 78% and 87%, respectively. In digital technology integration, 75% of Dutch Small and Medium-sized Enterprises (SMEs) demonstrate basic digital readiness, which is higher than the EU's 55%. Additionally, digital public services are advanced, with 92% e-government usage compared to the EU average of 65%.

== History ==
Internet in the Netherlands began with Centrum Wiskunde & Informatica (CWI) connecting to the NSFNET in 1988, the first sustained connection outside the United States. (Note: This was shortly after France's INRIA achieved a connection to the NSFNET.) (Note: The UK and Norway had been connected to the ARPANET since 1973 and Norway and University College London (UCL) adopted TCP/IP in 1982, ahead of the ARPANET.)

== Internet and digital progress ==
=== Fixed broadband ===
The Netherlands demonstrates a very robust level of fixed broadband infrastructure. Its adoption rate of 97% notably exceeds the EU average of 78%. For broadband speeds of at least 100 Mbit/s, the uptake is 47%, slightly above the EU's 41%. The Netherlands excels in Fast Broadband (NGA) coverage with 99%, surpassing the EU average of 90%. Its Fixed Very High Capacity Network (VHCN) coverage is also notable at 91%, compared to the EU average of 70%. Additionally, Fibre to the Premises (FTTP) coverage in the Netherlands is 52%, marginally above the EU's 50%.

=== Mobile broadband ===
Mobile broadband shows strong performance with a 94% take-up rate, higher than the EU average of 87%. However, the country is somewhat behind in 5G spectrum allocation, at 33% compared to the EU's 56%. Despite this, it achieves a notable 97% coverage of 5G in populated areas, exceeding the EU average of 66%.

=== Digital public services ===
According to the DESI 2022 report, the Netherlands ranks fourth in the EU for digital public services. A notable 92% of its internet users engage with e-government services, higher than the EU average of 65%. The country scores 85 out of 100 for digital services to citizens and 88 out of 100 for businesses, both above the EU averages of 75 and 82, respectively. Open data utilization is high at 92%, compared to the EU's 81%.

These achievements align with the country's strategic initiatives for digitalization, as outlined in the 2020 NL Digibeter Agenda and the I-Strategy for 2021–2025. Focused on inclusivity, accessibility, innovation, and ethical technology use, these strategies have supported the broad adoption of digital identity solutions, such as DigiD for citizens and eHerkenning for businesses, with over 96% of the population having access to at least one e-ID.

== Internet censorship ==
Government-mandated Internet censorship is nonexistent due to the House of Representatives speaking out against filtering on multiple occasions, although there have been proposals to filter child pornography and the Netherlands, like many countries, is grappling with how to prevent or control copyright infringement on the Internet. Internet filtering in the Netherlands is not classified by the OpenNet Initiative (ONI).

=== Child pornography ===
In 2008 Ernst Hirsch Ballin, then Minister of Justice, proposed a plan to regulate the blocking of websites known to contain child pornography. A blacklist would have been composed by the Meldpunt ter bestrijding van Kinderpornografie op Internet (hotline combating child pornography on the Internet) and used by Internet service providers to redirect the websites to a stop page. The blacklist would contain websites hosted in nations where the Dutch authorities had no means of tracking and prosecution. Situations such as the blocking of Wikipedia would have been avoided, according to the working group behind the filter.

Under the proposal, stop pages were to be hosted by individual providers, an example being UPC Netherlands. The pages would not log traffic since they were not being used as a tracking mechanism; rather, their use would be for private parties to contribute to combating the spreading of child pornography. This plan never gained traction and was only backed by UPC and an orthodox Protestant provider of filtered internet services, Kliksafe. Providers would not be forced to use it since that would be unconstitutional according to a research done by the governmental Scientific Research and Documentation Center (WODC) commissioned by the Ministry of Security and Justice.

In 2010 a report was released by the Werkgroep Blokkeren Kinderporno (working group for blocking child pornography). It compared the filter in its last form with information from the Internet Watch Foundation. While they had "much wider criteria", the number of websites on the block list went from 2000 in previous years to less than 400 in 2010. The report stated that in the Dutch situation this would mean an "almost complete lack of websites to block" because the sharing of the material was no longer done by conventional websites, but by other services. In 2011 the plan was pulled by Ivo Opstelten for this reason. The House of Representatives reaffirmed this by voting against the filter later that year, effectively killing any plans for government censorship.

=== Copyright infringement ===
In January 2012, the internet providers Ziggo and XS4ALL were required by a court order in a case brought by the Bescherming Rechten Entertainment Industrie Nederland (BREIN) to block the website of The Pirate Bay due to copyright infringement. This blocking raised questions within the government, customers, and the internet providers themselves, not only because of the blocking, but also about its randomness and the role of BREIN, an industry trade association that can change the blacklist. The Pirate Bay called BREIN a corrupt organization, while the government is mostly concerned about freedom of speech and privacy. In May 2012, the Internet providers KPN, UPC, T-Mobile, and Tele2 were also required to block The Pirate Bay. However, in January 2014, a court overturned the initial verdict and ruled that Ziggo and XS4ALL no longer have to block The Pirate Bay. BREIN has since moved to an appeal with the Hoge Raad, the highest court in the Netherlands, arguing that the ruling is in violation of European law. A month later, UPC unblocked access to the site following an agreement with BREIN.

As of September 2017, Ziggo and XS4All are once again ordered to block The Pirate Bay, this time by the Dutch Court. Other providers now also need to block the Pirate Bay.

=== Russia Today and Sputnik news ===
The websites of Russia Today and Sputnik were blocked on 2 March 2022 following a ruling from the European Commission. As of December 2024 the sites are still blocked. One of the main internet providers, Ziggo, uses a DNS block to prevent users from accessing the sites. When a different DNS is configured RT and Sputnik can still be accessed using a Ziggo connection.

== Network neutrality ==
In June 2011 the Dutch House of Representatives voted for network neutrality enforced by law. The revised Telecommunicatiewet ("Telecommunications Act") was formally ratified by the Senate in May 2012. Among other things the law prohibits the blocking of Internet content.

== Data retention ==
In accordance with European Union directive 2006/24/EC providers had to store information about internet traffic. While in the original implementation the duration was set to twelve months this was changed to six months due to questionable usefulness and necessity. The directive was annulled in 2014.

== See also ==
- .nl
- .frl
- IPv6 deployment
- Telecommunications in the Netherlands
