= .nl =

Top-level Internet domain for the Netherlands

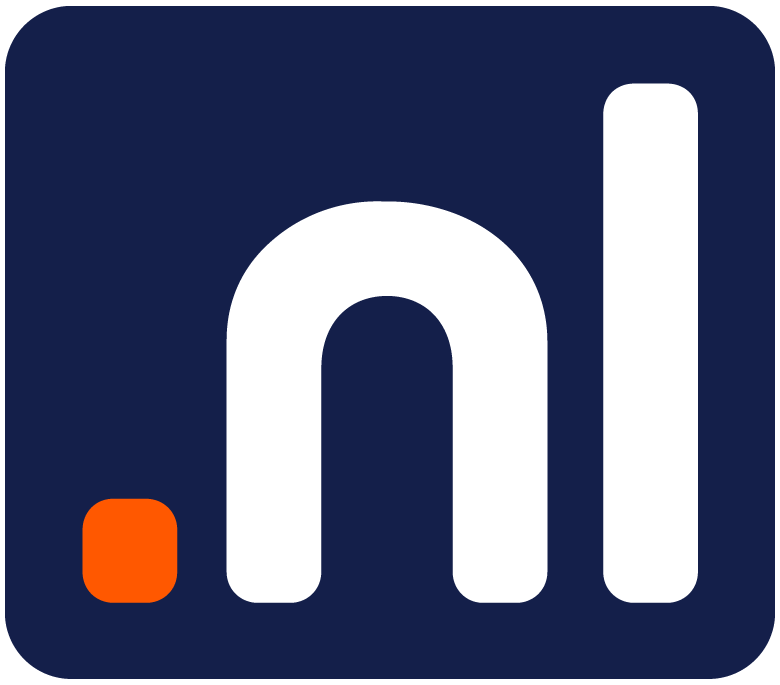
- Introduced: April 25, 1986; 40 years ago
- TLD type: Country code top-level domain
- Status: Active
- Registry: Stichting Internet Domeinregistratie Nederland
- Sponsor: Stichting Internet Domeinregistratie Nederland
- Intended use: Entities connected with the Netherlands
- Actual use: Very popular in the Netherlands
- Registered domains: 6,063,116 (February 2026)
- Registration restrictions: None
- Structure: Registrations are taken directly at the second level
- Dispute policies
- DNSSEC: Yes
- Registry website: SIDN

Logo of Stichting Internet Domeinregistratie Nederland, which administers the domain

.nl is the country code top-level domain (ccTLD) for the Netherlands. It is one of the most popular ccTLDs with over six million registered .nl domains as of 29 September 2020.

When cwi.nl was registered by Centrum Wiskunde & Informatica on 1986-05-01, .nl became the first active ccTLD outside the United States.

== Registry ==
Since 31 January 1996, .nl domains are registered by the Stichting Internet Domeinregistratie Nederland (SIDN, in English: Foundation for Internet Domain Registration Netherlands), based in Arnhem. Most registrars are Internet service providers, IT service bureaus and media service bureaus, but several large enterprises with many brand names have also become a registrar, or participant as SIDN calls them, which is a quite uncommon phenomenon in the domain name industry. Registrars have to pay SIDN a fee for each domain since 1 April 1996, until then registration was free. SIDN does not deal directly with registrants. In the early days, most of the registrants were universities and research departments of large companies, such as Philips Natuurkundig Laboratorium.

Besides .nl, SIDN also operates .politie in a partnership with the Dutch police and .amsterdam in cooperation with the municipality of Amsterdam and Dotlocal.

== Second-level domains ==
Official second-level domains do not exist. A number of companies have taken the opportunity to register domains like co.nl and com.nl, using them to sell third-level domains. These are not affiliated with SIDN.

Individuals were allowed to register a second-level .nl domain since 2003. As a forerunner, individuals were allowed to register a third-level domain since 2000. Such 'personal domains' had the form of janjansen.123.nl. They never became popular, and registration has been suspended since 2006. Because there were only around 500 of such domains registered, in contrast to about 5 million second-level domains, SIDN announced the discontinuance of personal domains as of 2008 on 4 July 2007.

== Technical limitations ==
Unlike the majority of top level domains, .nl requires each nameserver to use a unique IP address. There must be at least two nameservers set, meaning at least two different IP addresses must be used. Other TLDs with this requirement are .ca and .cn.

== Other country-code TLDs under the Kingdom of Netherlands ==
- .an – ccTLD for the former multi-nation Netherlands Antilles federation
- .aw – ccTLD for Aruba
- .bq – ccTLD for the Caribbean Netherlands (Bonaire, Sint Eustatius, and Saba)
- .cw – ccTLD for Curaçao
- .sx – ccTLD for Sint Maarten

== See also ==
- Internet in the Netherlands
- .amsterdam - TLD for Amsterdam
- .eu – ccTLD for the European Union
- .frl - TLD for the province of Friesland
