= .frl =

Internet top-level domain for Friesland

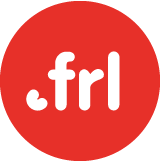
- Introduced: September 2, 2014
- Status: Active
- Registry: FRLregistry B.V.
- Intended use: Entities connected with Friesland
- Structure: Registrations are taken directly at the second level
- DNSSEC: yes
- Registry website: .FRL

.frl is the Internet top-level domain for Friesland. .frl domain names are issued by FRLregistry B.V., which is responsible for the domain. On September 1, 2014, the delegation took place and .frl was established. On September 2 the first .frl domain, nic.frl, went online.

== .fy April Fools' Day joke ==
.fy is a fictional top-level domain of Friesland, as provided on April 1, 2006, as an April Fools' Day joke by the equally fictitious Stichting Internet Domeinnammeregistraasje Fryslân (SIDF).

The reason for its own top-level domain was because it was felt that information in the West Frisian language had to be offered from domains where it could be read from the domain name that it was Frisian information.

== See also ==
- .amsterdam
- .cat
- .nl
- .eu
