= Caribbean Netherlands =

Caribbean municipalities of the Netherlands

Caribbean Netherlands Caribisch Nederland (Dutch)
- Overseas region of the Netherlands
- Flag Coat of arms
- Anthem: "Wilhelmus" (Dutch) (English: "William")
- Location of the Caribbean Netherlands (green and circled). From left to right: Bonaire, Saba, and Sint Eustatius
- Country: Netherlands
- Special municipalities: Bonaire; Sint Eustatius; Saba
- Incorporated into the Netherlands: 10 October 2010 (dissolution of the Netherlands Antilles)
- Largest city: Kralendijk
- Official languages: Dutch
- Recognised regional languages: English (Saba, St. Eustatius); Papiamentu (Bonaire)

Government
  - Monarch: Willem-Alexander
  - Lt. Governors (see Politics of the Netherlands): John Soliano (Bonaire); Alida Francis (Sint Eustatius); Jonathan Johnson (Saba)
  - National Rep.: Jan Helmond

Area
  - Total: 322 km^{2} (124 sq mi)
- Highest elevation (Mount Scenery): 870 m (2,850 ft)

Population
  - 2025 estimate: 31,980
  - Density: 77/km^{2} (199.4/sq mi)
- GDP (nominal): 2022 estimate
  - Total: US$725,000,000
- Time zone: UTC−4 (AST)
- Calling code: +599 (Telephone numbers in the Caribbean Netherlands)
- ISO 3166 code: BQ, NL-BQ1, NL-BQ2, NL-BQ3
- Currency: United States dollar ($) (USD)
- Internet TLD: .nl; .bq (Note: .bq is designated, but not in use, for the Caribbean Netherlands. Like the rest of the Netherlands, .nl is primarily in use.)

The Caribbean Netherlands (Dutch: Caribisch Nederland, pronounced [kaˈribis ˈneːdərlɑnt]) is a geographic region of the Netherlands located outside Europe, in the Caribbean, consisting of three special municipalities. These are the islands of Bonaire, Sint Eustatius, and Saba, (Note: "Bonaire, Sint Eustatius and Saba" is the listed English name for the territorial grouping in the International Organization for Standardization's ISO 3166-1, where the English spelling was corrected from Saint Eustatius with the release of ISO 3166-1 Newsletter VI-9.) as they are also known in legislation, or the BES islands for short. The islands are officially classified as public bodies in the Netherlands and as overseas territories of the European Union; as such, European Union law does not automatically apply to them.

Bonaire (including the islet of Klein Bonaire) is one of the Leeward Antilles and is located close to the coast of Venezuela. Sint Eustatius and Saba are in the main Lesser Antilles group and are located south of Sint Maarten and northwest of Saint Kitts and Nevis. The Caribbean Netherlands, a term distinct from the comprehensive Dutch Caribbean, has a population of 31,980.

== Legal status ==
The three islands gained their current status following the dissolution of the Netherlands Antilles on 10 October 2010. At the same time, the islands of Curaçao and Sint Maarten became constituent countries (Dutch: landen) within the Kingdom of the Netherlands. The island of Aruba is also a constituent country of the Kingdom, having gained its status in 1986 after seceding from the Netherlands Antilles.

The constituent countries of the Dutch kingdom are autonomous (self-governing) while the special municipalities (Caribbean Netherlands) are legally part of the constituent country of the Netherlands. The Kingdom of the Netherlands consists of the constituent countries of Aruba, Curaçao, Sint Maarten and The Netherlands (which includes Bonaire, Saba, St. Eustatius).

The term "Dutch Caribbean" may refer to the three special municipalities (e.g. for stamps), but may also refer to all of the Caribbean islands within the Kingdom of the Netherlands. The Caribbean Netherlands, not to be confused with the comprehensive Dutch Caribbean, has a population of 31,980 as of 2025. Their total area is 328 square kilometres (127 sq mi).

In 2012, the islands of the Caribbean Netherlands voted for the first time, due to being special municipalities of the Netherlands, in the 2012 Dutch general election.

== Administration ==

The special municipalities (Dutch: bijzondere gemeenten) carry many of the functions normally performed by Dutch municipalities. The executive power rests with the Governing Council headed by an Island governor. The main democratic body is the island council. Dutch citizens of these three islands are entitled to vote in Dutch national elections and (as all Dutch nationals) in European elections.

Officially the islands are classed in Dutch law as being openbare lichamen (literally translated as "public bodies") and not gemeenten (municipalities). Unlike normal municipalities, they do not form part of a Dutch province and the powers normally exercised by provincial councils within municipalities are divided between the island governments themselves and the central government by means of the National Office for the Caribbean Netherlands. For this reason, they are called "special" municipalities.

Many Dutch laws have a special Caribbean Netherlands version. For example, social security is not on the same level as it is in the European Netherlands.

Flag	Name	Capital	Area	Population (January 2024)	Density
(Bonaire)	Bonaire	Kralendijk	288 km^{2} (111 sq mi)	25,133	69/km^{2} (180/sq mi)
(Sint Eustatius)	Sint Eustatius	Oranjestad	21 km^{2} (8.1 sq mi)	3,204	150/km^{2} (390/sq mi)
(Saba (island))	Saba	The Bottom	13 km^{2} (5.0 sq mi)	2,060	148/km^{2} (380/sq mi)
Total			322 km^{2} (124 sq mi)	30,397	77/km^{2} (200/sq mi)

Age-Sex Pyramid

=== National Office ===
The National Office for the Caribbean Netherlands (Dutch: Rijksdienst Caribisch Nederland) is responsible for taxation, policing, immigration, transport infrastructure, health, education, and social security in the islands and provides these services on behalf of the Government of the Netherlands. This agency was established as the Regional Service Centre in 2008 and became the National Office for the Caribbean Netherlands on 1 September 2010. The current director is Jan Helmond. The Representative for the public bodies of Bonaire, Sint Eustatius and Saba represents the Government of the Netherlands on the islands and also performs tasks similar to a King's Commissioner. The current representative is Gilbert Isabella.

=== Relationship with the European Union ===
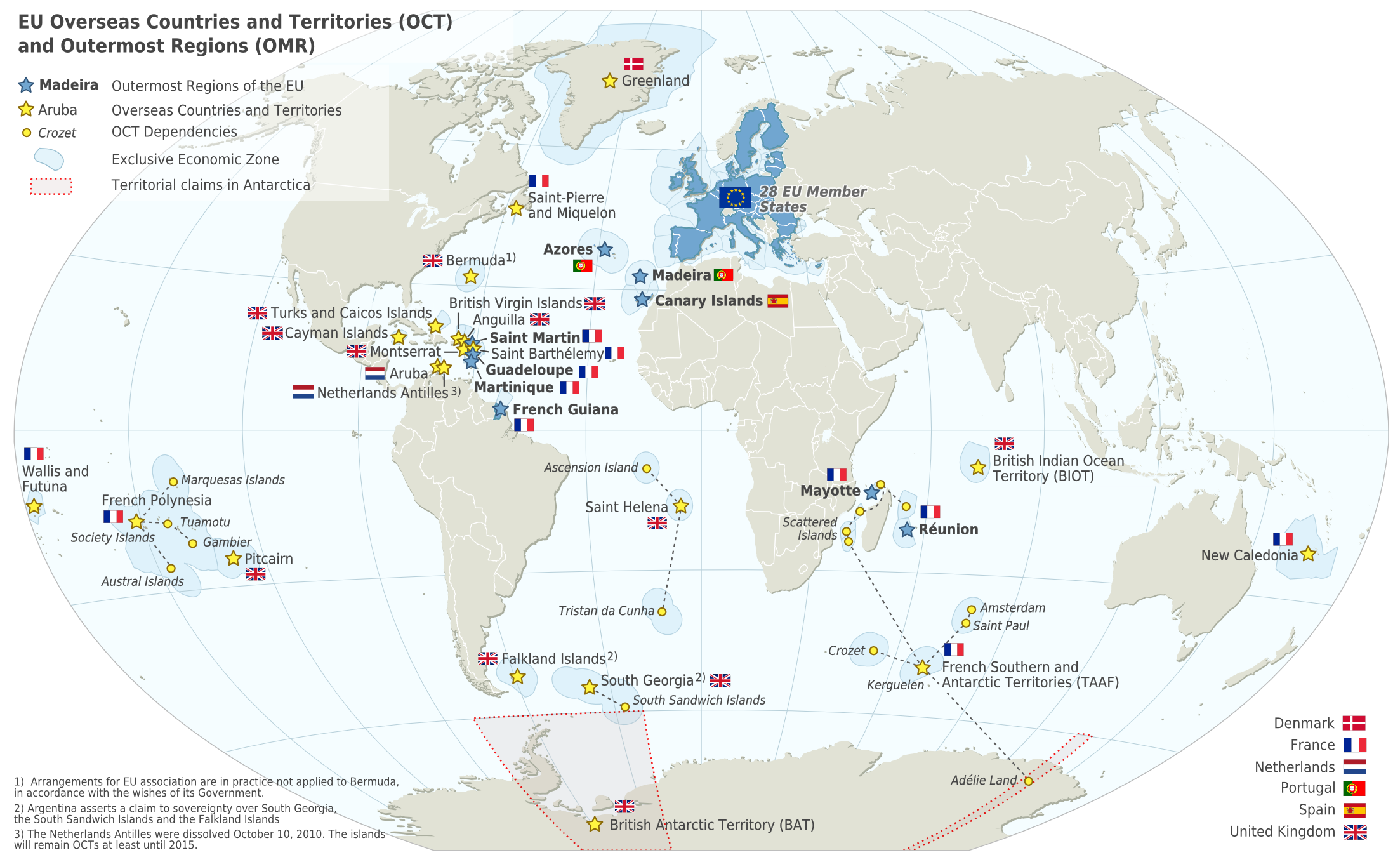
The special territories of the European Union (2019 before UK secession)

The islands do not form part of the European Union and instead constitute "overseas countries and territories" (OCT status) of the Union, to which special provisions apply. (Note: Per the Annex II of the Treaty on the Functioning of the European Union.) The Lisbon Treaty introduced a procedure where the European Council may change the status of an overseas territory of Denmark, France, or the Netherlands regarding the application of the EU treaties to that territory. (Note: Now contained in Article 355(6) of the Treaty on the Functioning of the European Union.) In June 2008, the Dutch government published a survey of the legal and economic impacts by a switched status from OCT to outermost region (OMR). The position of the islands was reviewed after a five-year transitional period, which began with the dissolution of the Netherlands Antilles in October 2010. The review was conducted as part of the planned review of the Dutch "Act for the public bodies Bonaire, Sint Eustatius and Saba" (Dutch: "Wet openbare lichamen Bonaire, Sint Eustatius en Saba (WolBES)"), where the islands have been granted the option to become an OMR – and thus a direct part of the European Union. In October 2015, the review concluded the present legal structures for governance and integration with European Netherlands was not working well within the framework of WolBES, but no recommendations were made in regards of whether a switch from OCT to OMR status would help improve this situation.

=== Foreign policy and defence ===
The Kingdom of the Netherlands has overarching responsibility for foreign relations, defence and Dutch nationality law in the Caribbean parts of the Kingdom. Units of the Netherlands Armed Forces deployed in the Caribbean include:

- 32 Infantry Company of the Royal Netherlands Marine Corps on Aruba;
- a Marine Corps detachment on Sint Maarten;
- a Fast Raiding Interception and Special Forces Craft (FRISC) troop (fast boats) on Curaçao and Aruba;
- a company of the Royal Netherlands Army on Curaçao on a rotational basis;
- a guardship, normally a Holland-class offshore patrol vessel, from the Royal Netherlands Navy on station on a rotational basis;
- the Royal Netherlands Navy support vessel HNLMS Pelikaan;
- Arumil (Aruban) and Curmil (Curaçaoan) militia elements;
- a Netherlands Armed Forces Royal Marechaussee brigade.

Additionally, the Dutch Caribbean Coast Guard is funded by the four countries of the Kingdom of the Netherlands. The Coast Guard is managed by the Ministry of Defence and is directed by the commander of the Royal Netherlands Navy in the Caribbean.

== Geography ==
The Caribbean Netherlands form part of the Lesser Antilles. Within this island group:

- Bonaire is part of the ABC islands within the Leeward Antilles island chain off the Venezuelan coast. The Leeward Antilles have a mixed volcanic and coral origin.
- Saba and Sint Eustatius are part of the SSS islands within the Leeward Islands. They are located east of Puerto Rico and the Virgin Islands. The locals (French, Spanish, Dutch and the locally spoken English) consider them part of the Windward Islands, although, in the international English language, the Windward Islands refer to other islands farther south. These two islands are of volcanic origin and hilly, leaving little ground suitable for agriculture. The highest point is Mount Scenery, 870 m (2,850 ft), on Saba. This is the highest point in the country and in the entire Kingdom of the Netherlands.
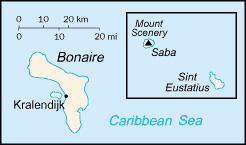
Map showing Bonaire, Sint Eustatius, and Saba

Relative distance between mainland Netherlands in Europe and the Caribbean Netherlands

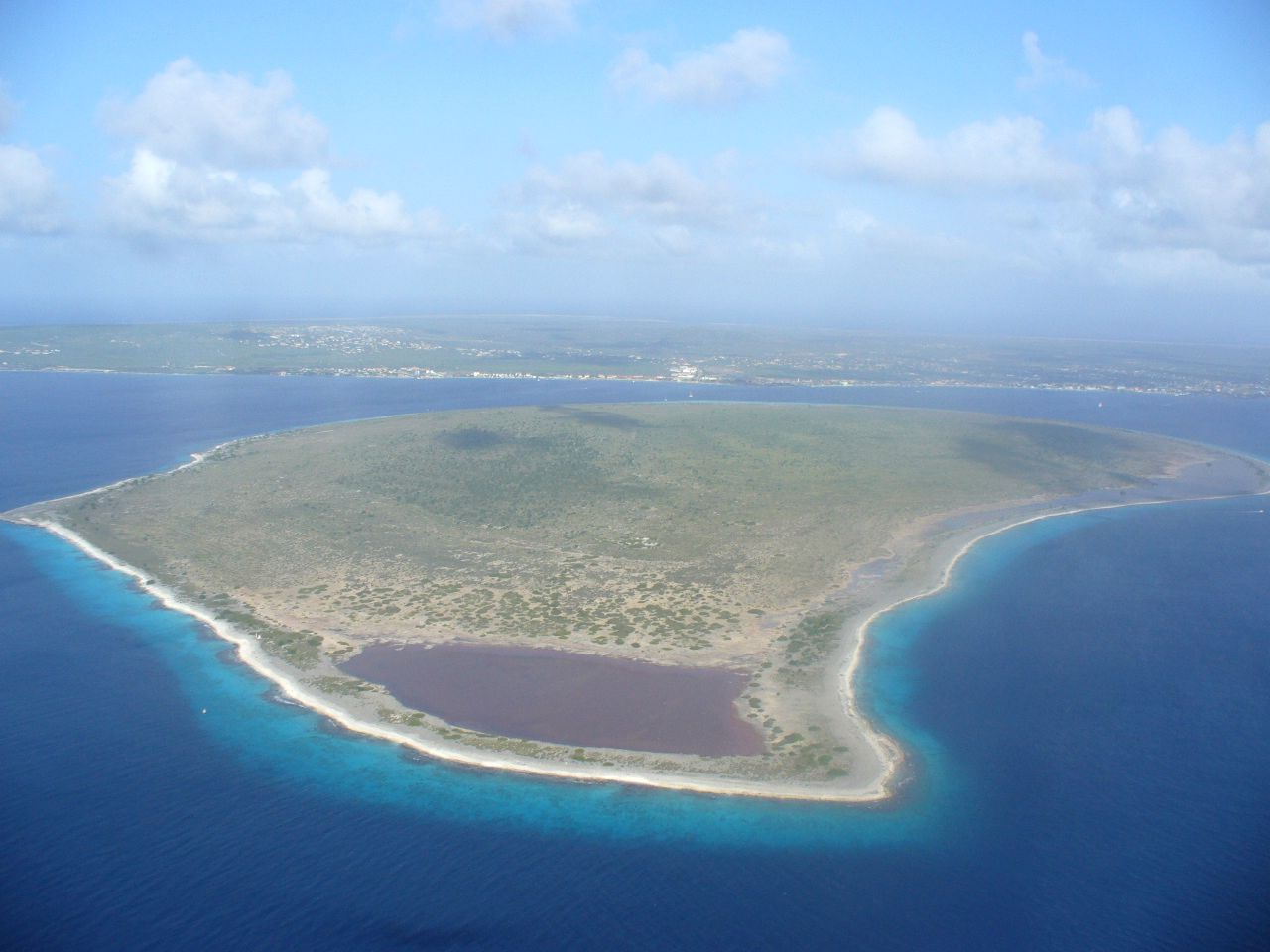
Klein Bonaire (Bonaire in the background)

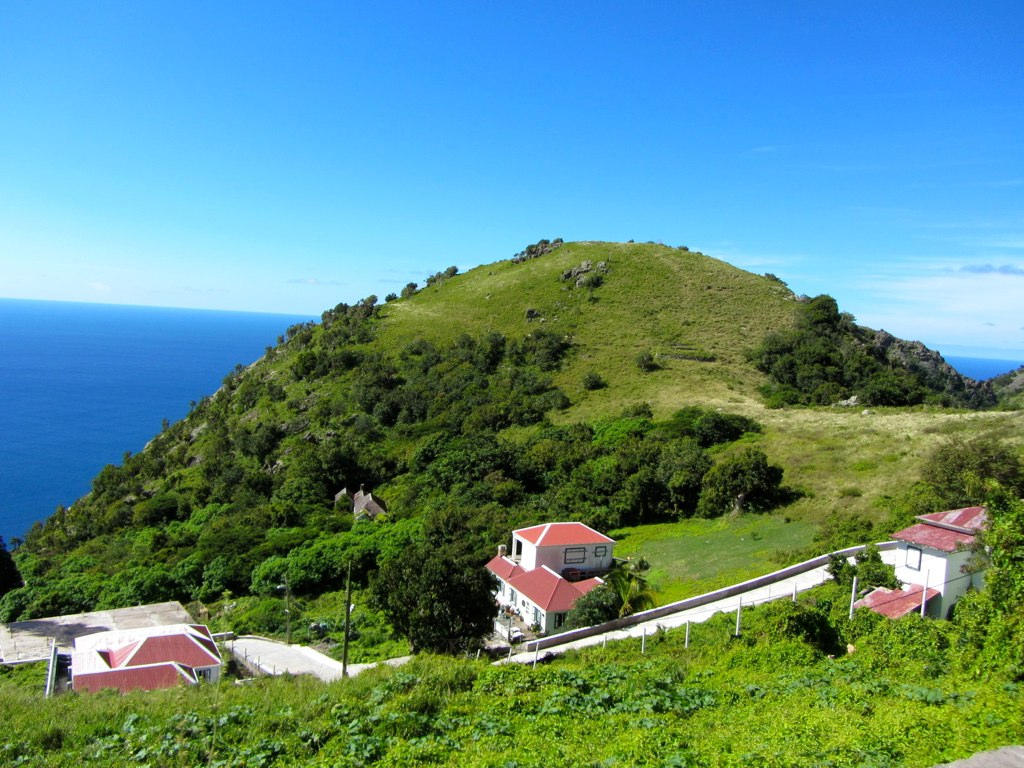
The hilly terrain of Saba

=== Climate ===
The islands of the Caribbean Netherlands enjoy a tropical climate with warm weather all year round. The Leeward Antilles are warmer and drier than the Windward islands. In summer, the Windward Islands can be subject to hurricanes.

Forest cover is around 6% of the total land area of the Caribbean Netherlands, equivalent to 1,910 hectares (ha) of forest in 2020, which was unchanged from 1990. In 2020, naturally regenerating forest covered 1,910 hectares and planted forest covered 0 hectares. Of the naturally regenerating forest 0% was reported to be primary forest (consisting of native tree species with no clearly visible indications of human activity) and around 17% of the forest area was found within protected areas.

== Demographics ==
=== Languages ===
Languages spoken in the Caribbean Netherlands (2021)
Languages	Percent
English	85.8%
Dutch	56.8%
Spanish	54.2%
Papiamentu	53.0%
Other	9.2%

Like the rest of the Dutch Caribbean and European Netherlands, English is widely spoken in the Caribbean Netherlands, though unlike most other parts of the kingdom (with the exception of Sint Maarten), English is the primary language in Saba and Sint Eustatius. It is also spoken as a second language by the majority of people in Bonaire.

Bonaireans primarily speak Papiamentu as their first language, though generally also speak Dutch, English and Spanish. A significant number of Sabans and Sint Eustatians also speak Dutch, Spanish and Virgin Islands Creole, though many do not. Therefore, English is regarded as the lingua franca of the Caribbean Netherlands.

== Currency ==
Until 1 January 2011, the three islands used the Netherlands Antillean guilder; after that all three switched to the U.S. dollar, rather than the euro (which is used in the European Netherlands) or the Caribbean guilder (which is being adopted by the other two former Antillean islands of Curaçao and Sint Maarten).

== Communications ==
The telephone country code remains 599, that of the former Netherlands Antilles, and is shared with Curaçao. The International Organization for Standardization has assigned the ISO 3166-1 alpha-2 country code ISO 3166-2:BQ for these islands. The IANA has not established a root zone for the .bq Internet ccTLD and whether it will be used is unknown.

== See also ==
- 2010 Bonaire constitutional referendum
- Identity cards of Bonaire, Sint Eustatius and Saba
- ISO 3166-2:BQ, the ISO codes for the subdivisions of the Caribbean Netherlands
- Postage stamps and postal history of the Caribbean Netherlands
