= Telecommunications in Curaçao =

Telecommunications in Curaçao.

== Telephone ==
The ITU international calling code for the country is +599.

== Radio ==
Terrestrial radio stations operating in Curaçao include the following.

=== FM radio ===
Frequency	Call letters	Branding	Tower location
88.3		00 Rockórsou	Seru Pretu / Zwarteberg
00.0		Radio Krioyo	Willemstad
00.0		Radio Energy	Seru Pretu / Zwarteberg
91.5		Hit Radio	Willemstad
92.1		Direct Life 92.1	Seru Pretu / Zwarteberg
92.7		Radio Deltha 92.7	Willemstad
93.3		TeleCuraçao FM	TeleCuraçao Toren
93.9		Radio Kórsou FM	Santa Catharina
94.5	PJC-21	Legria	Araratberg (TC Toren)
95.1	PJZ1	Clazz FM	Willemstad
95.7		Mi-95	Seru Pretu / Zwarteberg
96.5		Radio New Song	Seru Pretu / Zwarteberg
97.3		Dolfijn FM	Seru Pretu / Zwarteberg
97.9		Easy FM	Seru Pretu / Zwarteberg
98.5		Radio Semiya FM	Grote Berg
00.0		Radio Lighthouse	Willemstad
99.7		Radio Mas	Grote Berg
00.0		Hit 000.0	Seru Pretu / Zwarteberg
101.1	PJ09	Laser 101	Grote Berg
101.9		Radio Hoyer 1	Grote Berg
103.1		Paradise FM	Grote Berg
103.9	PJQ1	Radio One	Seru Pretu / Zwarteberg
104.5		Radio Active	Willemstad
105.1		Radio Hoyer 2	Grote Berg
106.3		Fiesta FM	Willemstad
107.1		Direct 107	Seru Pretu / Zwarteberg
107.9		Rumbera Network	Seru Pretu / Zwarteberg

=== AM Radio ===
Frequency	Call letters	Branding	Tower location
0	PJZ86	Z86 Radio	Willemstad
0		Radio Caribe	

=== AM from nearby countries ===
Some radio stations from mainland Venezuela and Bonaire can be received in Curaçao:

Frequency	Call letters	Branding	Tower location
0	YVKE	Mundial Radio	Venezuela, Caracas, Cerro El Ávila, Tabacal
0	YVLX	Radio Rumbos	Venezuela, Villa de Cura
0	YVNA	Ondas de los Medanos	Venezuela, Coro
0	YVKY	Radio Capital	Venezuela, Caracas, El Junquito
0	YVKS	Radio Caracas Radio	Venezuela, Caracas, El Junquito
0	PJB	Radio Trans Mundial	Bonaire
0	YVNN	Radio Punto Fijo	Venezuela, Punto Fijo

== Television ==
Operating television stations include:

Call letters	Branding	Analog (VHF)	Digital (UHF)	Virtual
PJC-TV	TeleCuraçao	8	28	8.1
	TeleCuraçao 2			8.2
	How TV			8.3
	Nos Pais Television	4		
	CBA Television	11		
	TV Direct 13	13		

Cable TV providers:

- Columbus Communications
- United Telecommunication Services (UTS) / TDS TV Distribution Systems N.V.

Over-the-top media services:

- Cariflix

== Internet ==
- Country code: .cw (Curaçao West Indies)
- As of 2016, an estimated 138,750 people use the Internet in Curaçao, or 93.6% of the population.
- Internet service providers include UTS, FLOW, and Tres.
