= Religion in Curaçao =

Religion in Curaçao has played an important role in the islands history and culture. The island, a constituent country of the Kingdom of the Netherlands, is predominantly Roman Catholic. Although significant minorities of other faiths exist.

== Christianity ==
Curaçao is a primarily Christian nation. Christianity in the nation differs heavily across person to person, with several denominations having a presence on the island.

=== Catholicism ===
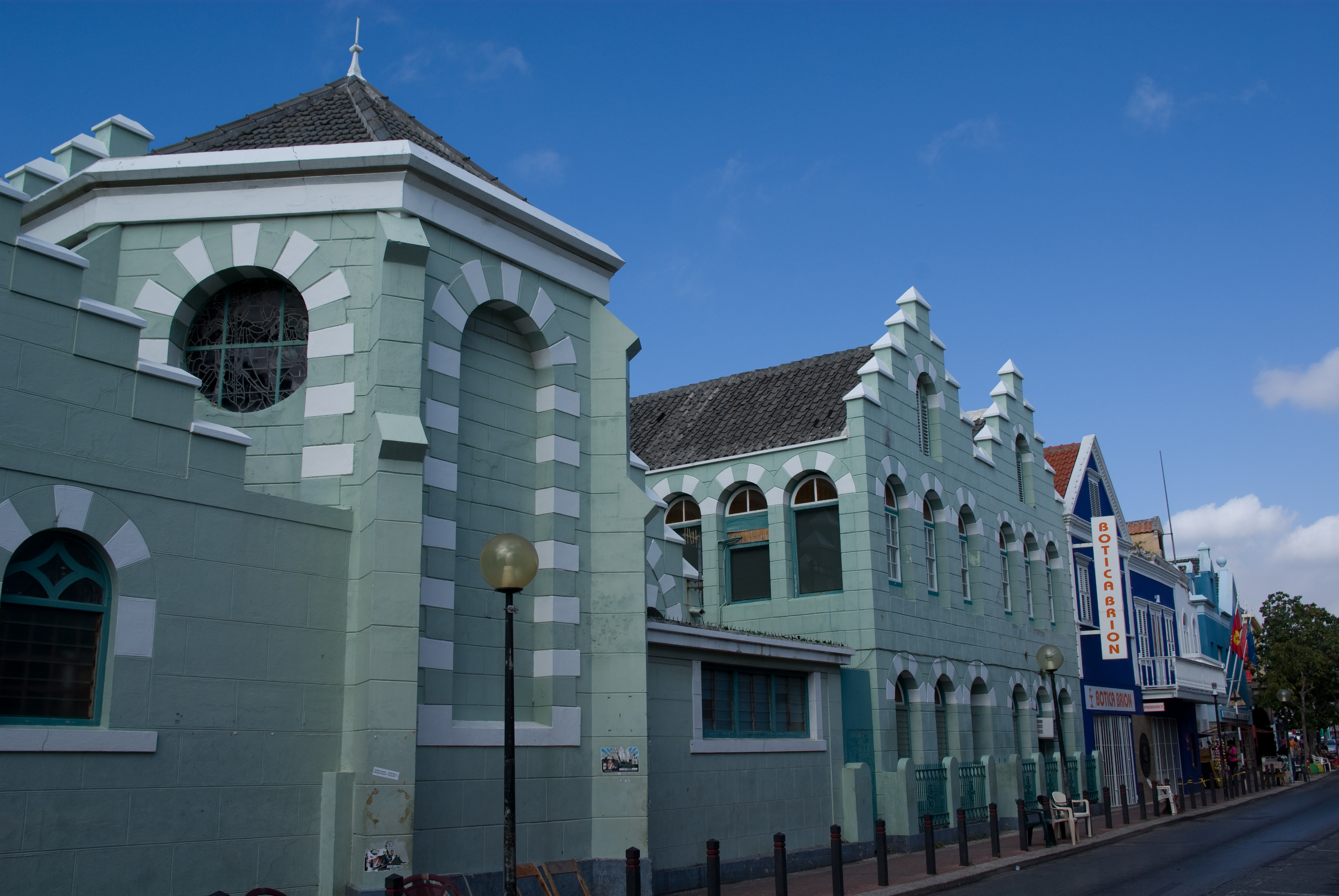
Basilica of St. Anne in Willemstad, Curaçao

Curaçao is mostly Catholic, with 72.8% of Curaçao's population being members of the Catholic church.

The entire island falls within the jurisdiction of the Roman Catholic Diocese of Willemstad, which also extends to Aruba, Bonaire, Saba, Sint Eustatius, and Sint Maarten. The bishop of the diocese is Luigi Antonio Secco, who was ordained in 2001.

Catholicism was introduced to the island in 1525 by Juan Martínez de Ampiés, who made an attempt to convert Arawak natives he was deporting as slave labor to Hispaniola. Later, a mission was constructed by six Catholic Spaniards.

In 1751, Curaçao's first Roman Catholic church was constructed. The Basilica of St. Anne was built by a Puerto-Rican clergyman in Otrabanda. The church currently serves as the co-cathedral, alongside the Queen of the Most Holy Rosary Cathedral, of the Diocese of Willemstad.

=== Church of Jesus Christ of Latter-day Saints ===
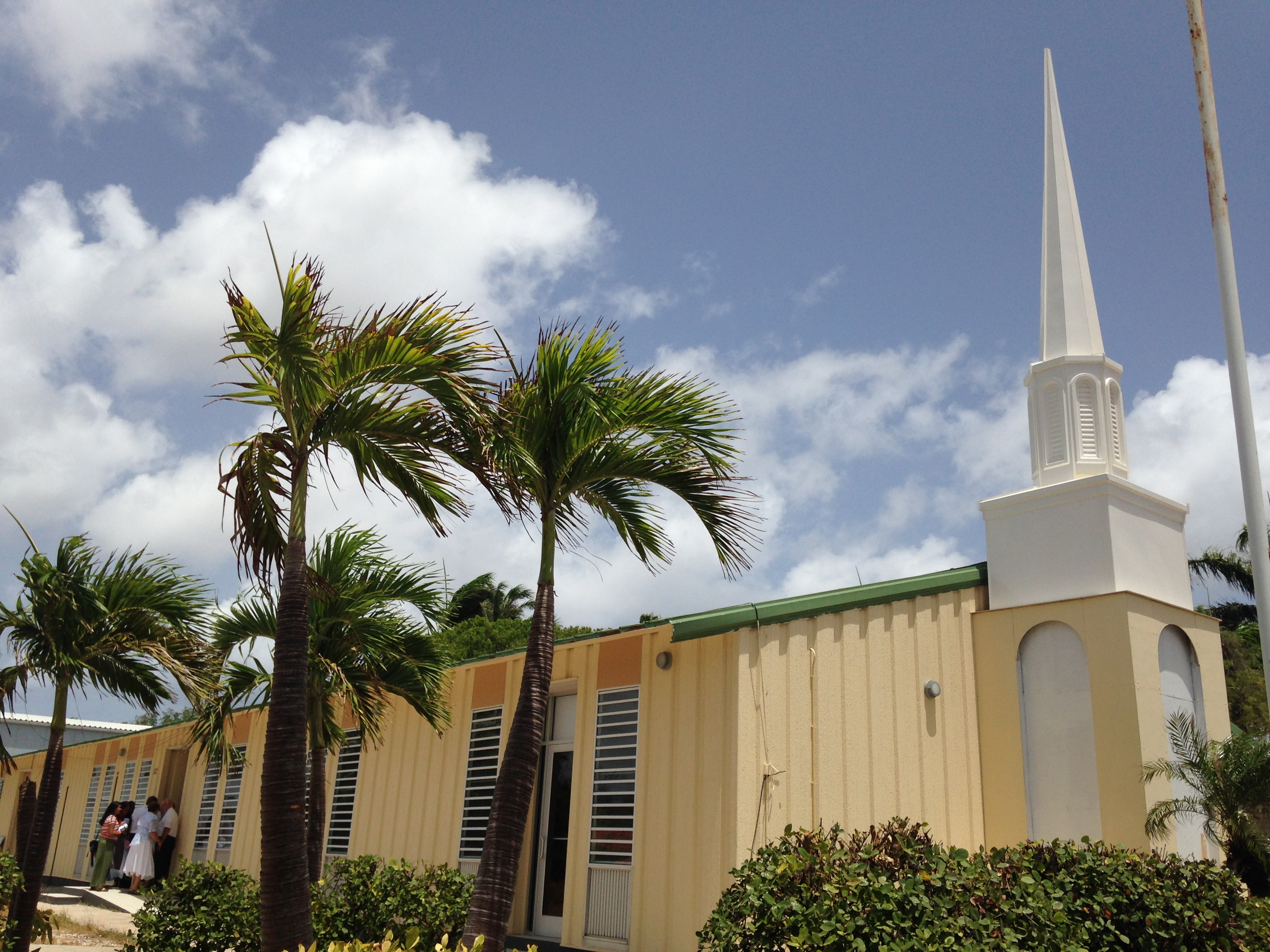
LDS Branch in Curaçao

The Church of Jesus Christ of Latter-day Saints has a small presence in Curaçao. The church operates one congregation with 582 members located in Willemstad. The congregation's meetinghouse operates a FamilySearch Center. The congregation is part of the ABC Islands District of the Churches jurisdiction.

=== Protestant ===
Though the Netherlands is mostly Protestant, they sparingly made efforts to spread the faith to their colony in Curaçao. However, some attempts were still made. In 1635 the first Protestant, a Dutch preacher named Fredericus Vitteus, arrived on the Island. Following the conquest of Curaçao by the Dutch West India Company, the Dutch began construction of Fort Amsterdam. For the Dutch colonists stationed at the fort, a Dutch Reformed Church was built. The church, known as the Fort Church, is still in operation as part of the United Protestant Church of Curaçao.

== Hinduism ==
Hinduism comprises a small minority in Curaçao, making up about 0.5% of the island's population. Like most Caribbean islands, Hinduism is primarily practiced by local Indo-Caribbean populations. Hinduism in Curaçao originated with indentured labourers who were brought from India to the Caribbean between the years 1838 and 1920.

== Islam ==
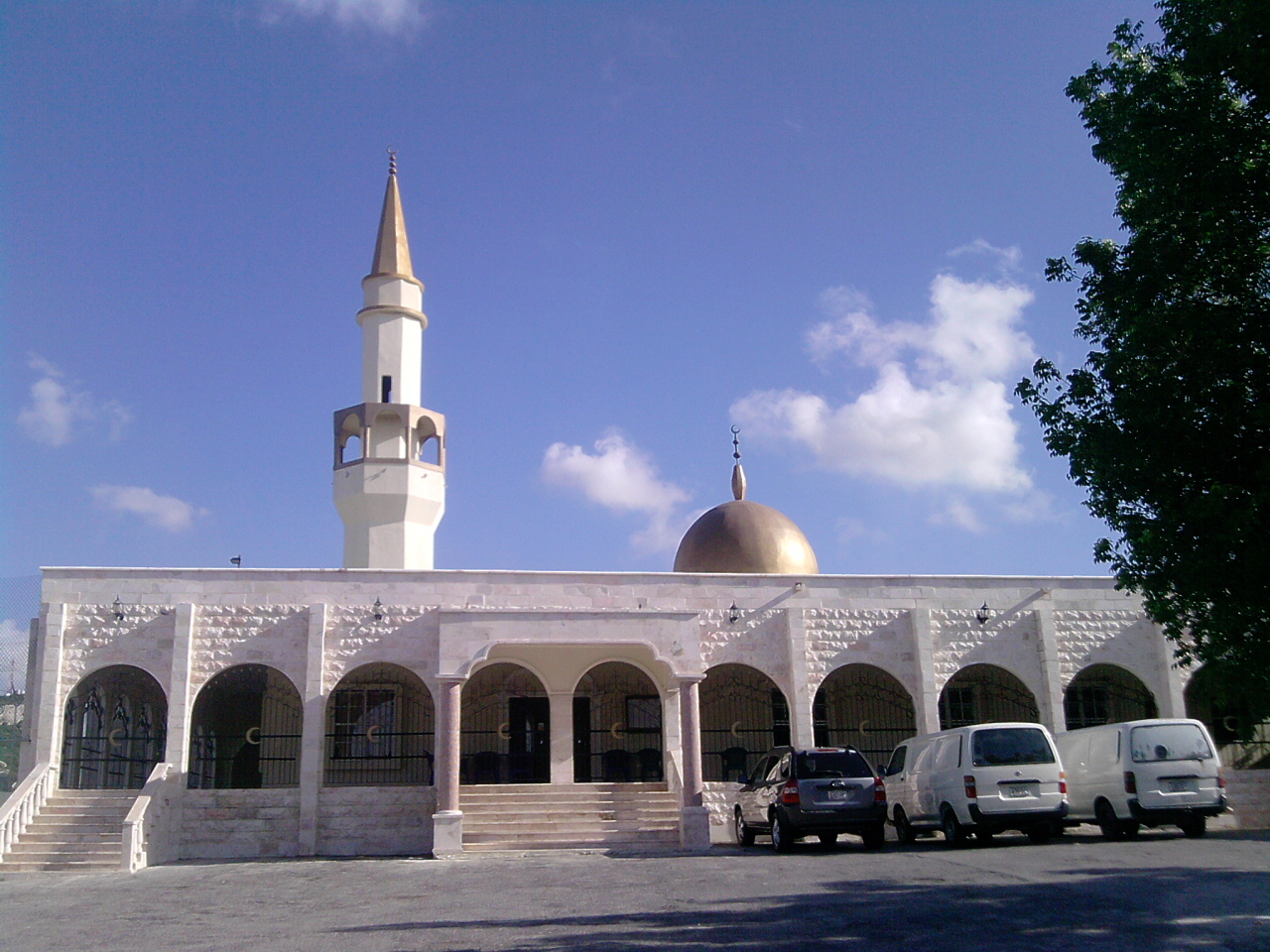
Curaçao Islamic Center

Curaçao has the largest population of Muslims in the former Netherlands Antilles, most of whom are immigrants from Lebanon, Syria and Suriname. The Omar bin Al-Khattab Mosque in Otrobanda is the only mosque on the island and the former Netherlands Antilles.

== Judaism ==
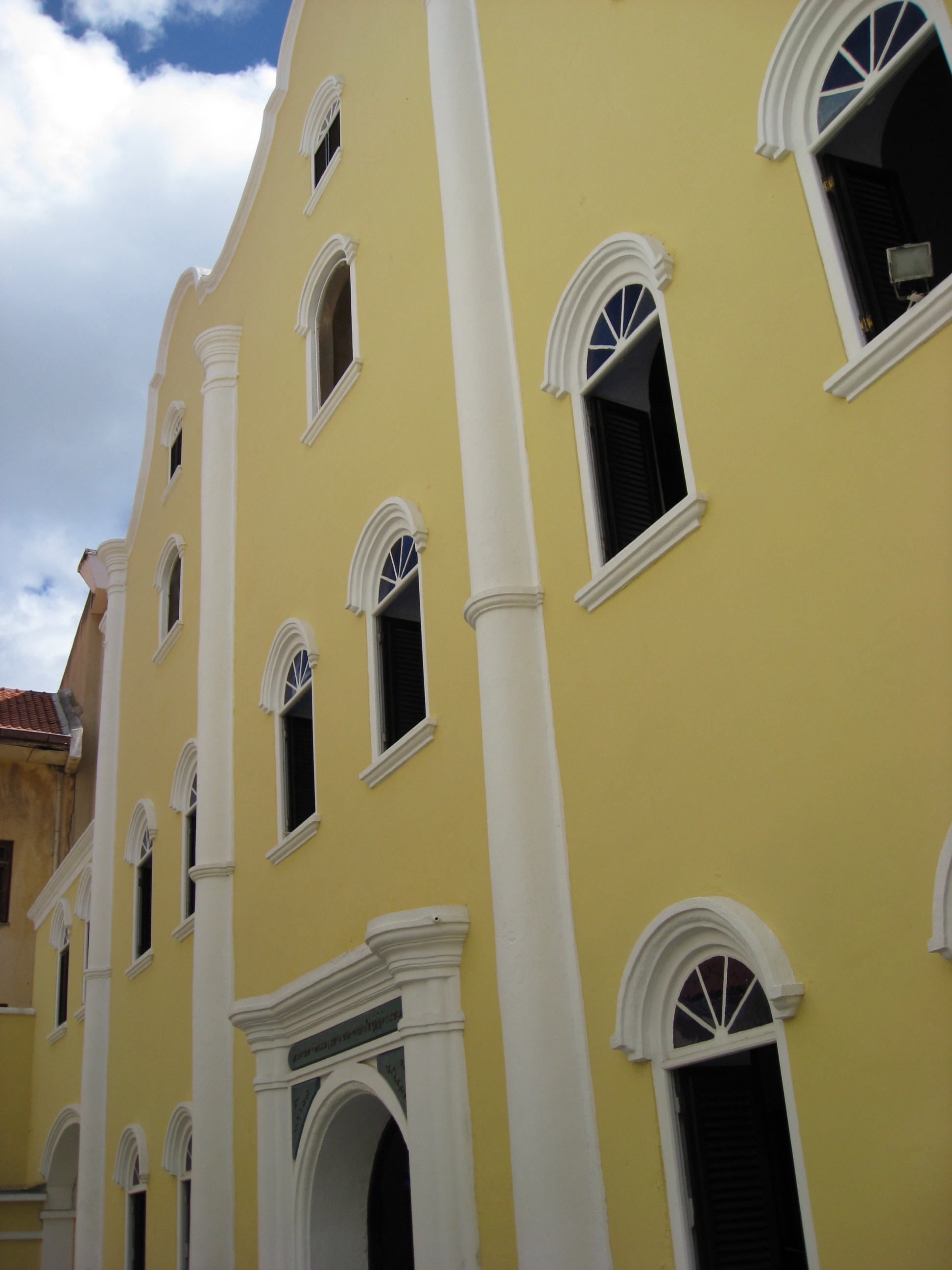
The Mikvé Israel-Emanuel Synagogue is the oldest currently standing synagogue in the Western Hemisphere.

Curaçao's Jewish community has had a profound impact on the islands history.

Curaçao is home to the Mikvé Israel-Emanuel Synagogue, which is the oldest currently active synagogue in the Americas.

Sephardic Jews originally migrated to Curaçao from Spain to escape oppression. This was part of a larger migration to the Netherlands which was also taking place. The Jews quickly established themselves on the island, becoming prominent in the trading economy of Curaçao. The island's Jewish population grew quickly, and by 1785 about 40 percent, of the island's European population were Sephardic Jews.

As of the most recent census, Curaçao has a Jewish population of about 300.

== Montamentu ==
Montamentu is a syncretic Afro-Caribbean faith practiced in Curaçao. An African diaspora religion, the faith has origins in the transatlantic slave trade. Montamentu is polytheistic and pays reverence to Roman Catholic saints, as well as African deities.
