= Our Lady of Coromoto Church, Antriol =

Our Lady of Coromoto Church
- Parokia La Birgen di Coromoto
- Our Lady of Coromoto Church
- 12°10′13.8″N 68°16′14.5″W
- Location: Antriol; Bonaire
- Country: Netherlands
- Denomination: Roman Catholic Church

The Our Lady of Coromoto Church (Papiamento: Parokia La Birgen di Coromoto) also known as the Parish of Our Lady of Coromoto is a religious building belonging to the Catholic Church and is located in the town of Antriol on the island of Bonaire, a dependent territory of the Kingdom of the Netherlands in the Caribbean Sea.

It is one of two churches in the Diocese of Willemstad (Dioecesis Gulielmopolitana) are dedicated to the Marian devotion of Our Lady of Coromoto in neighboring Venezuela venerated as patroness. The other being the Church of Our Lady of Coromoto Charro in Curacao.

== See also ==
- Roman Catholicism in the Caribbean part of the Kingdom of the Netherlands
- Our Lady of Coromoto
