= St. Philomena's Church, Paradera =

St. Philomena's Church
- Parokia Santa Filomena; St. Filomenakerk
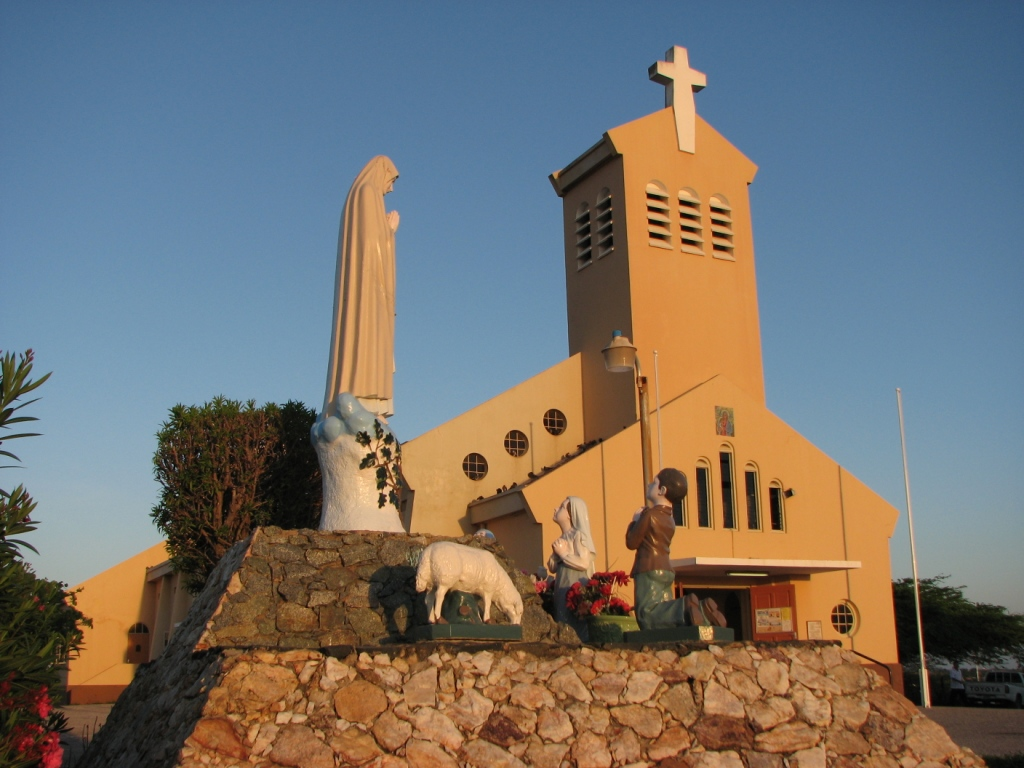
- St. Philomena's Church
- 12.5356°N 70.0043°W
- Location: Paradera; Aruba
- Country: Netherlands
- Denomination: Roman Catholic Church

The St. Philomena's Church (Papiamento: Parokia Santa Filomena Dutch: St. Filomenakerk) is a religious building belonging to the Catholic Church located in the town of Paradera, on the Caribbean island of Aruba, an autonomous country in the Kingdom of the Netherlands in the Lesser Antilles.

The temple follows the Roman or Latin rite and depends on the Catholic Diocese of Willemstad (Dioecesis Gulielmopolitana). As its name implies was dedicated to St. Philomena, a Greek virgin and martyr venerated in the Catholic Church.

It is also a major tourist attraction in Paradera, as the building dominates the skyline compared to the rest of the local architecture.

== See also ==
- Roman Catholicism in Aruba
- St. Philomena's Church (disambiguation)
