= St. Francis of Assisi Church, Oranjestad =

St. Francis of Assisi Church
- Parokia San Francisco di Asis; Sint Franciscus Kerk
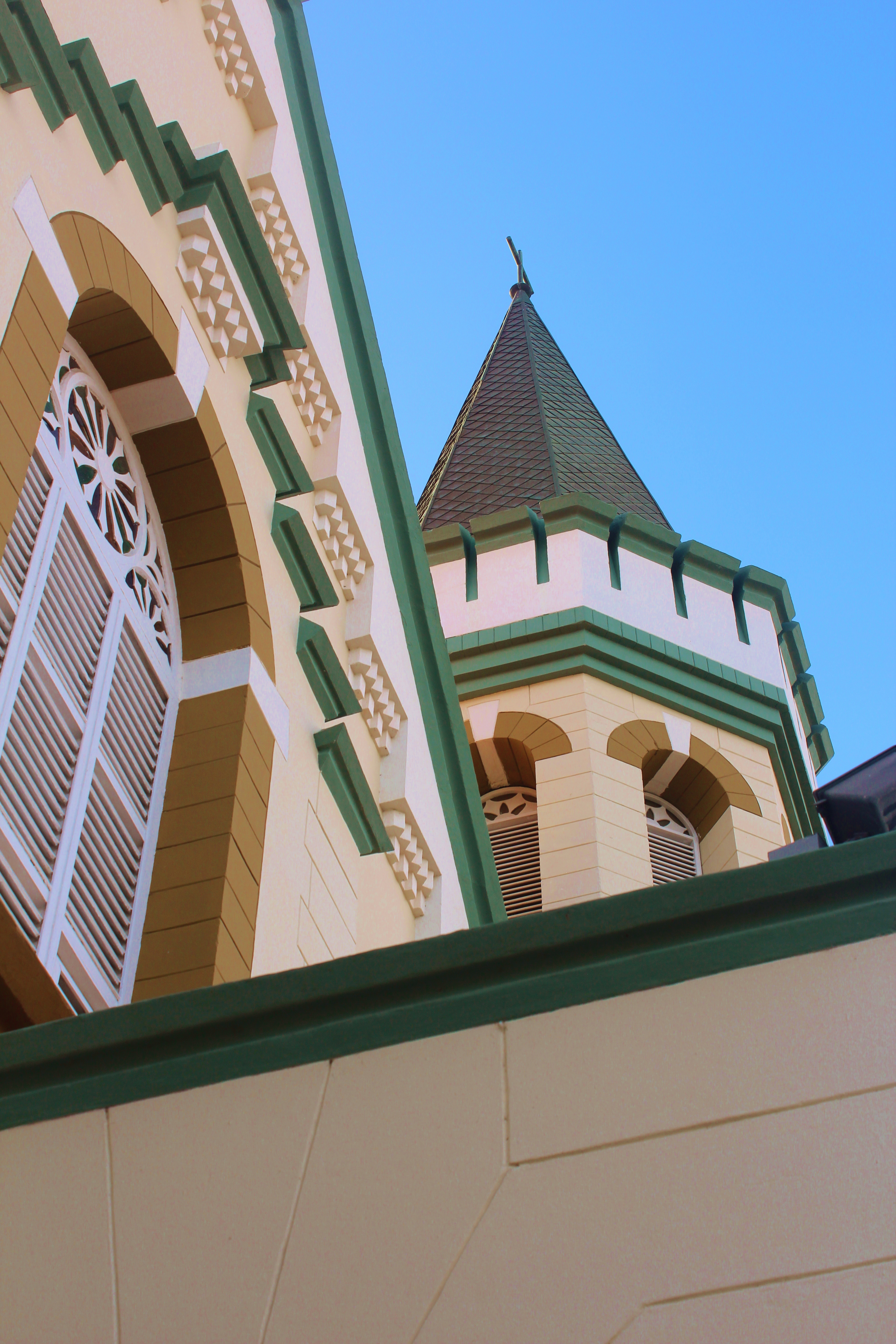
- St. Francis of Assisi Church
- 12.5224°N 70.0349°W
- Location: Oranjestad; Aruba
- Country: Netherlands
- Denomination: Roman Catholic Church

The St. Francis of Assisi Church (Papiamento: Parokia San Francisco di Asis Dutch: Sint Franciscus Kerk) also alternatively called Pro Cathedral of St. Francis of Assisi is a religious building belonging to the Catholic Church and serves as the pro-cathedral or temporary cathedral in the city of Oranjestad, on the Caribbean island of Aruba, an autonomous country in the Kingdom of the Netherlands in the Lesser Antilles.

It is a church that follows the Roman or Latin rite and is within the Diocese of Willemstad (Dioecesis Gulielmopolitana). This is one of the most important churches in Aruba that was built in 1829 and offering religious services in Papiamento and English.

== See also ==
- Roman Catholicism in Aruba
- St. Francis of Assisi Church (disambiguation)
- A.J. van Koolwijk
