= St. Bernard Church, Kralendijk =

St. Bernard Church
- Parokia San Bernardo
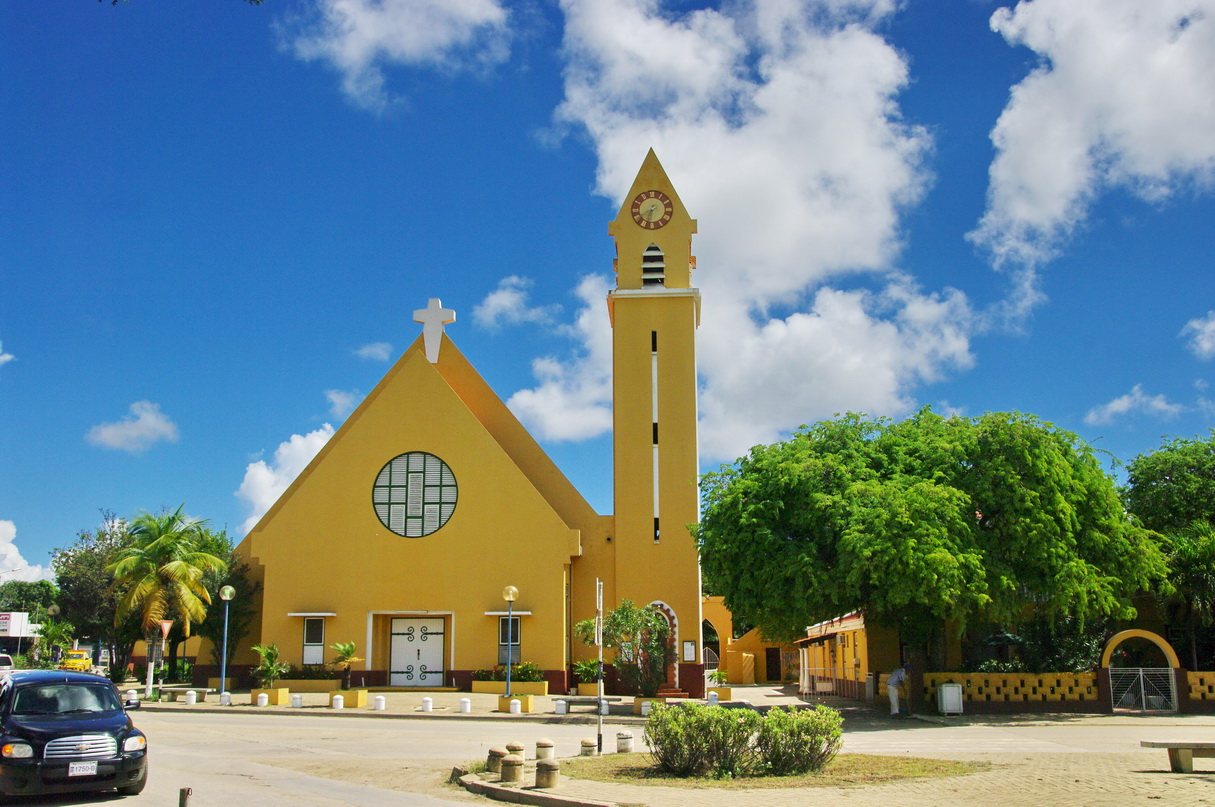
- St. Bernard Church
- 12.1527°N 68.2732°W
- Location: Kralendijk, Bonaire
- Country: Netherlands
- Denomination: Roman Catholic Church

The St. Bernard Church (Papiamento: Parokia San Bernardo) is a religious building belonging to the Catholic Church and is located in the city of Kralendijk, the capital of the Caribbean island of Bonaire, a territory in the Caribbean Netherlands organised as a special municipality of the Netherlands in the Antilles.

The temple follows the Roman or Latin rite and depends on the Catholic Diocese of Willemstad on the neighbouring island of Curaçao, a constituent country of the Kingdom of the Netherlands. The yellow and white colour scheme and its triangular main part stands out, and is topped by a cross. It is adjacent next to the bell tower. It offers mass in the local language Papiamento.

Two previous churches in honour of St. Bernard were built on this site: one in the eighteenth century and the other in 1829. The current church was built in 1948.

== See also ==
- Roman Catholicism in the Caribbean part of the Kingdom of the Netherlands
- Roman Catholic Diocese of Willemstad
