= Fort Orange (disambiguation) =

Fort Orange may refer to:

- Fort Orange (New Netherland), now Albany, New York
- Fort Orange (Bonaire) on the island of Bonaire
- Fort Orange (Dutch Brazil)
- Fort Orange (Ghana)
- Fort Orange (Gorée) on the island of Gorée off the coast of Senegal
- Fort Orange (Sint Eustatius) in Oranjestad, Sint Eustatius
- Fort Orange (Taiwan), now Tainan

Dutch: Fort Oranje

- Fort Oranje (Ternate), the administrative center of the Dutch East India Company before its transfer to Batavia
- Fort Oranje (Sint Eustatius), a historic Dutch fortress in the Dutch Caribbean
