= Mary Star of the Sea Church, Simpson Bay =

Coordinates: 18.0387°N 63.0973°W

Mary Star of the Sea Church
- Maria Sterre der Zee kerk
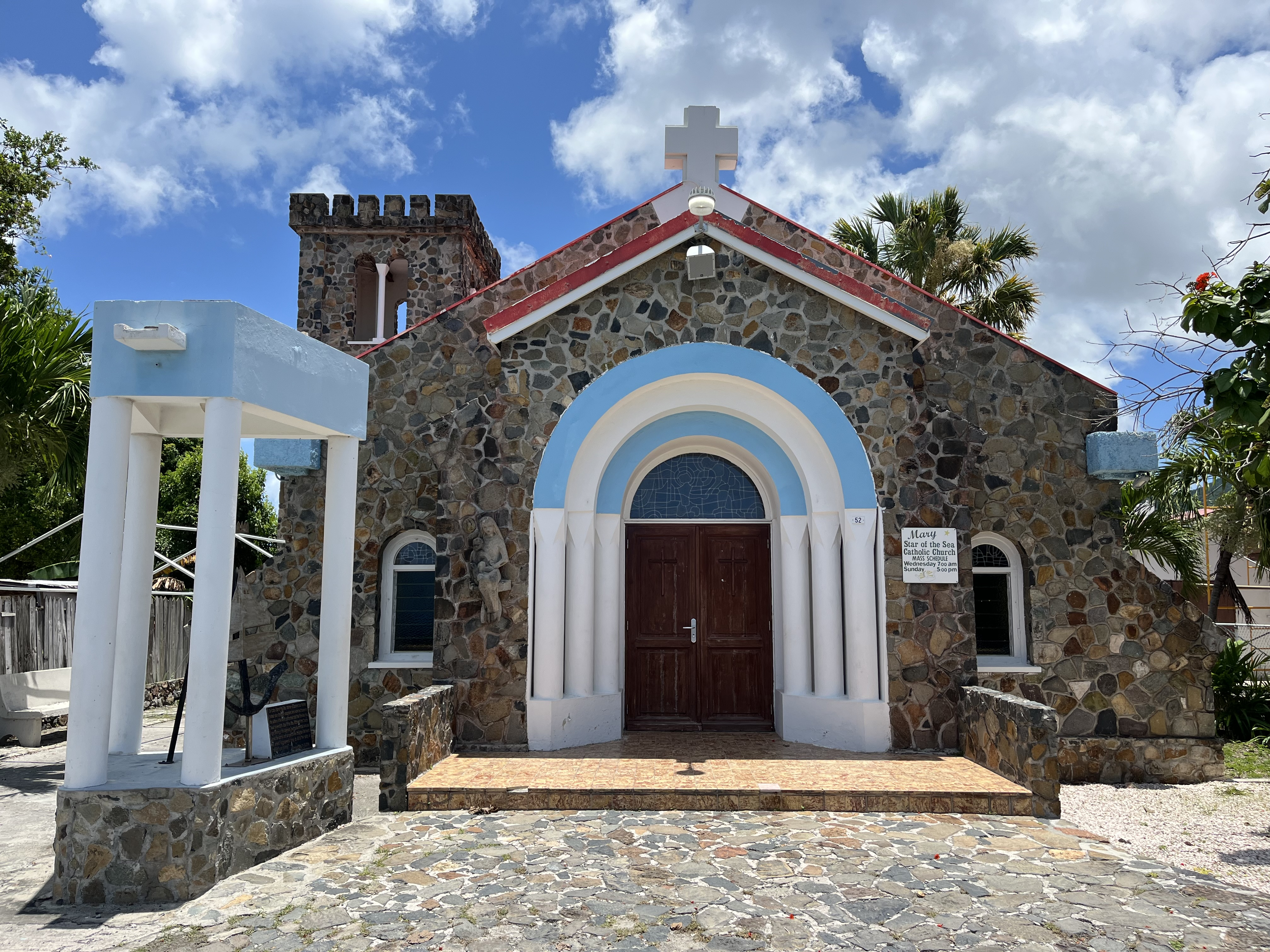

- Location within Sint Maarten
- Location: Sint Maarten
- Country: Netherlands
- Denomination: Roman Catholic Church

The Mary Star of the Sea Church (Dutch: Maria Sterre der Zee kerk) is a religious building of the Catholic Church located in the town of Simpson Bay in St. Maarten in the Dutch part of the Caribbean island of St. Martin in the Lesser Antilles, a constituent country of the Kingdom of the Netherlands.

It is a temple that follows the Roman or Latin rite and depends on the Catholic Diocese of Willemstad based on the island of Curacao. All Masses are offered in English.

Its history dates back to 1897 when it began as a small chapel, which was later replaced by the need for a larger building and this church was dedicated to St. Mary Star of the Sea in 1965.

== See also ==
- Roman Catholicism in Sint Maarten
- Mary Star of the Sea
