= Antriol =

Antriol Entrejol
- Neighbourhood
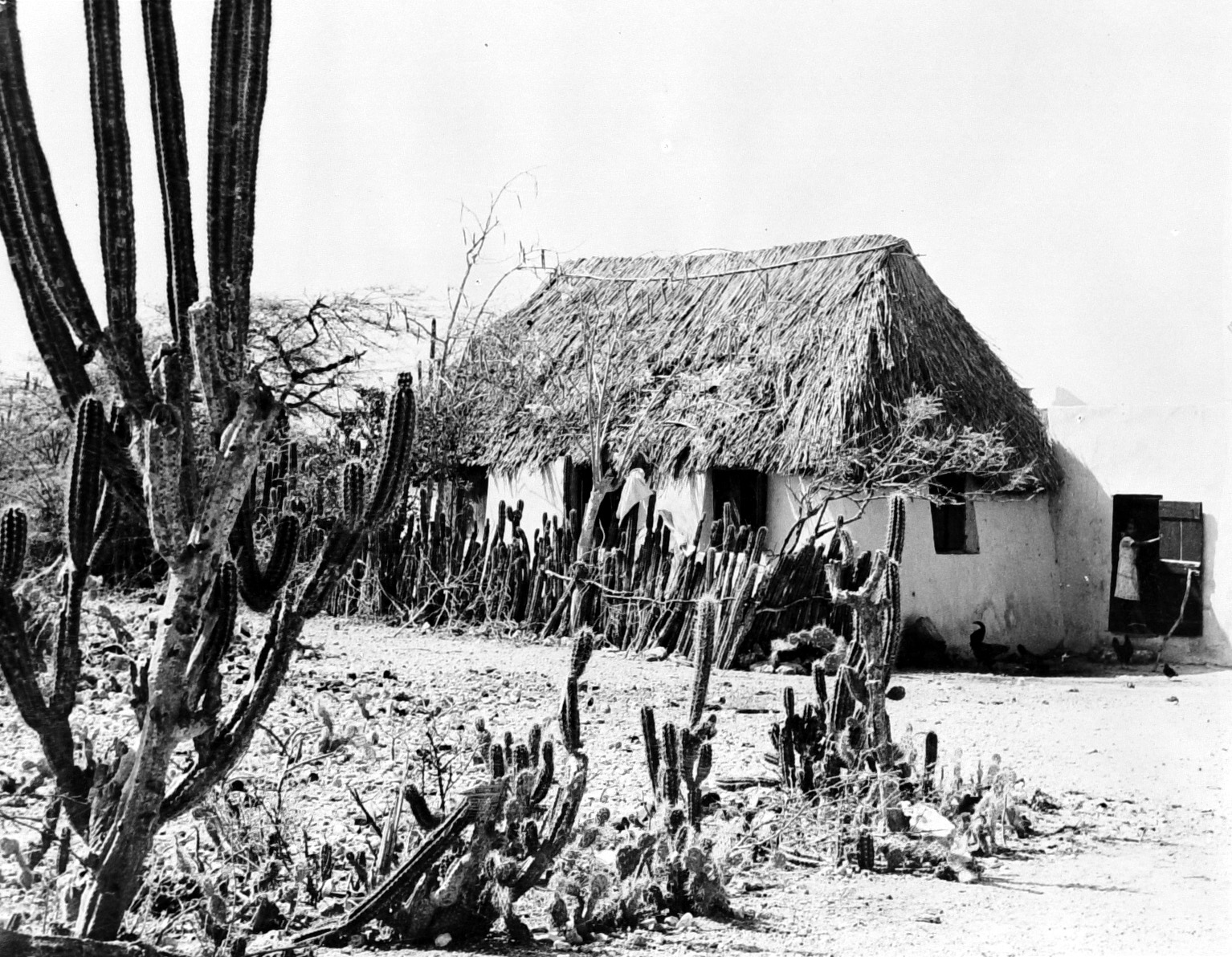
- A house in Antriol (1947)

- Flag

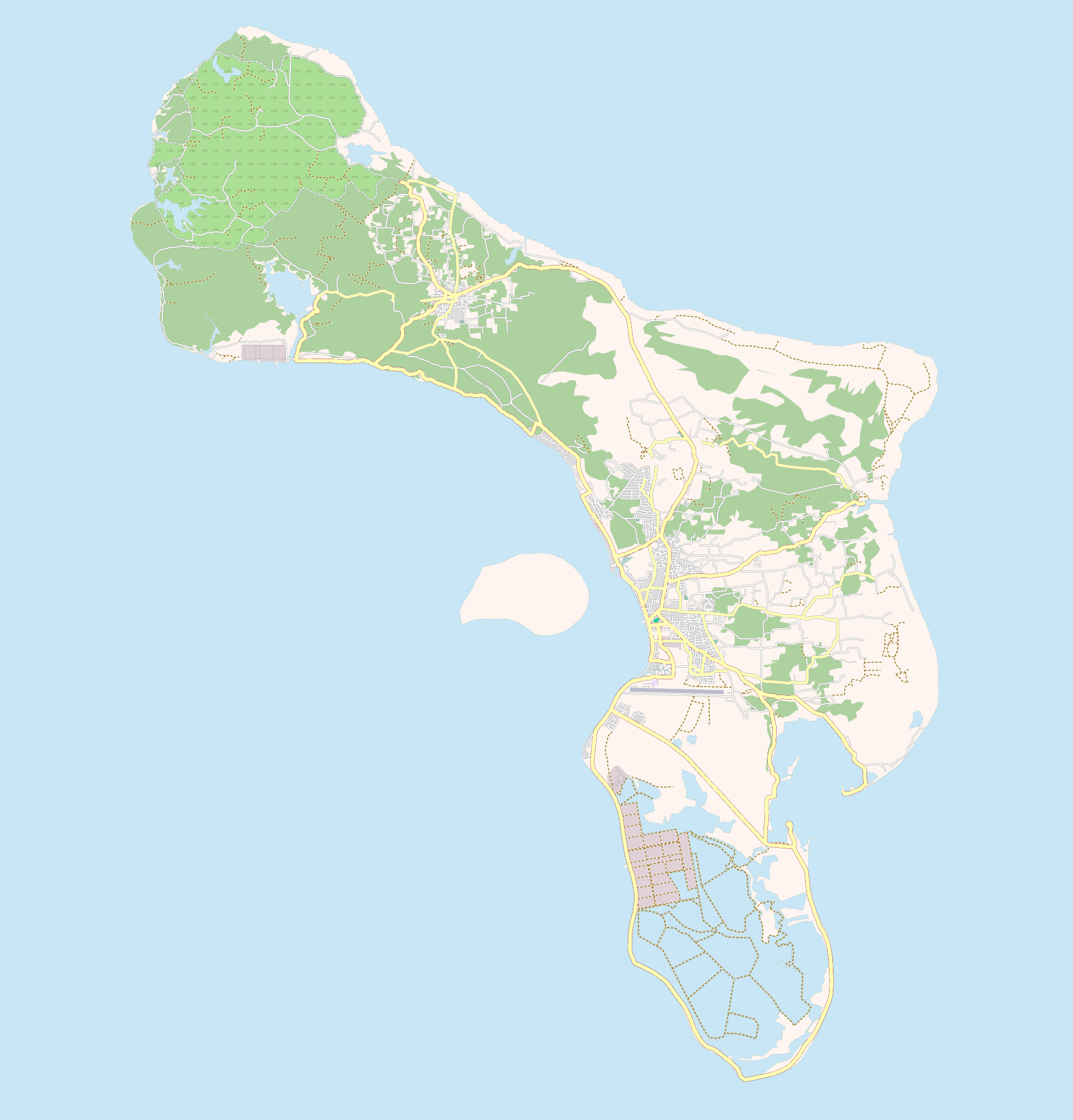
- Location in Bonaire
- Country: Netherlands
- Public body: Bonaire
- City: Kralendijk

Population (2017)
  - Total: 3,811

Antriol (also Entrejol) is a neighbourhood of Kralendijk on the island of Bonaire in the Caribbean Netherlands. It used to be a separate village which merged with four other villages–Nikiboko, Noord Saliña, Playa, and Tera Kora to form Kralendijk. Situated just inland from the central business district, it had 3,811 residents, home to around 15% of the island’s population.

== History ==
In 1526, Spanish commander Juan de Ampies brought a few Spanish settlers and developed Bonaireas a plantation and a meat farm. In the early 17th century, Dutch colonists brought Spanish and Portuguese prisoners deported from Aruba and Curaçao, who founded the settlement of Antriol. After the Eighty Years War, Dutch gained control of the region in 1636. Antriol was originally named Al Interior (the interior) which was corrupted to Antriol or Entrejol. The people of Antriol were mainly employed in the salt mines and lived in self-made houses. It was not until the 1930s that concrete buildings started to be built.

== Geography ==
Antriol is situated inland from the commercial and historic center of Playa in Kralendijk. The terrain of Bonaire is largely flat and consists of coastal limestone rock, with salt ponds and fringing reefs around the island. It used to be a separate village which have now combined with four other villages–Nikiboko, Noord Saliña, Playa, and Tera Kora to form the capital of Kralendijk. It is located close to the Flamingo International Airport near Kralendijk.

== Demographics ==
As of 2017, Antriol had about 3,811 residents, making it the second-largest settlement on Bonaire after Kralendijk. It represents about 15% of Bonaire’s population, projected at approximately 24,720. Our Lady of Coromoto Church is a major place of worship located in Antriol.
