= List of lighthouses in Bonaire =

This is a list of lighthouses in Bonaire.

== Lighthouses ==
| Name | Image | Year built | Location & coordinates | Class of Light | Focal height | NGA number | Admiralty number | Range nml |
|---|---|---|---|---|---|---|---|---|
| Ceru Bentana Lighthouse | | n/a | Rincon; 12°18′18.1″N 68°22′34.1″W | Fl (4) W 22s. | 44 metres (144 ft) | 16056 | J6416 | 15 |
| Boca Spelonk Lighthouse | | 1910 | Kralendijk; 12°12′44.2″N 68°11′47.5″W | Fl W 5s. | 30 metres (98 ft) | 16064 | J6414 | 15 |
| Lacre Punt Lighthouse | | n/a | Kralendijk; 12°01′42.0″N 68°14′14.2″W | Fl W 9. | 23 metres (75 ft) | 16100 | J6411 | 14 |
| Punt Vierkant Lighthouse | Image | n/a | Kralendijk; 12°06′50.3″N 68°17′40.7″W | Fl (3) W 22s. | 9 metres (30 ft) | 16096 | J6409 | 5 |
| Kralendijk Lighthouse | | 1932 | Kralendijk; 12°08′56.0″N 68°16′36.2″W | Fl W 2s. | 13 metres (43 ft) | 16093 | J6408.3 | 5 |
| Punt Wekoewa Lighthouse | Image | n/a | Rincon; 12°13′37.7″N 68°24′39.0″W | Fl (3) W 20s. | 15 metres (49 ft) | 16060 | J6403 | 12 |

== See also ==
- Lists of lighthouses and lightvessels
