= Kralendijk =

Largest city in Bonaire, Caribbean Netherlands

Kralendijk Playa (Papiamento)
- Capital city
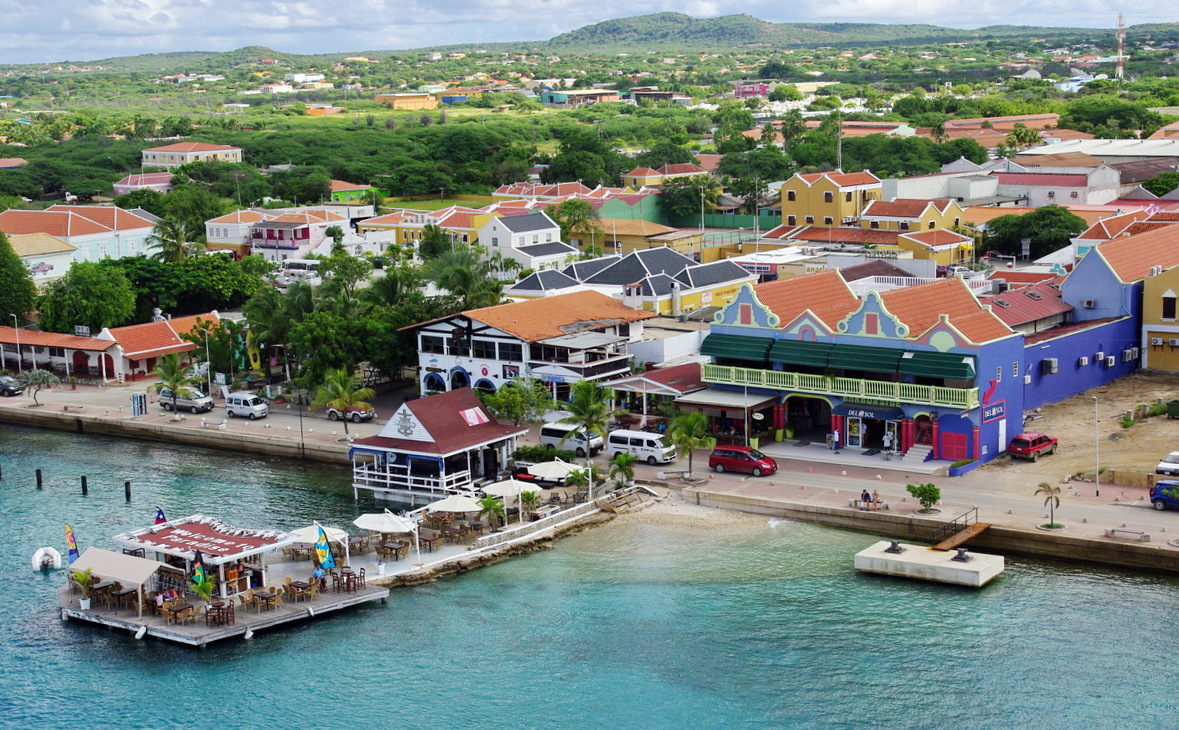
- Harbour of Kralendijk

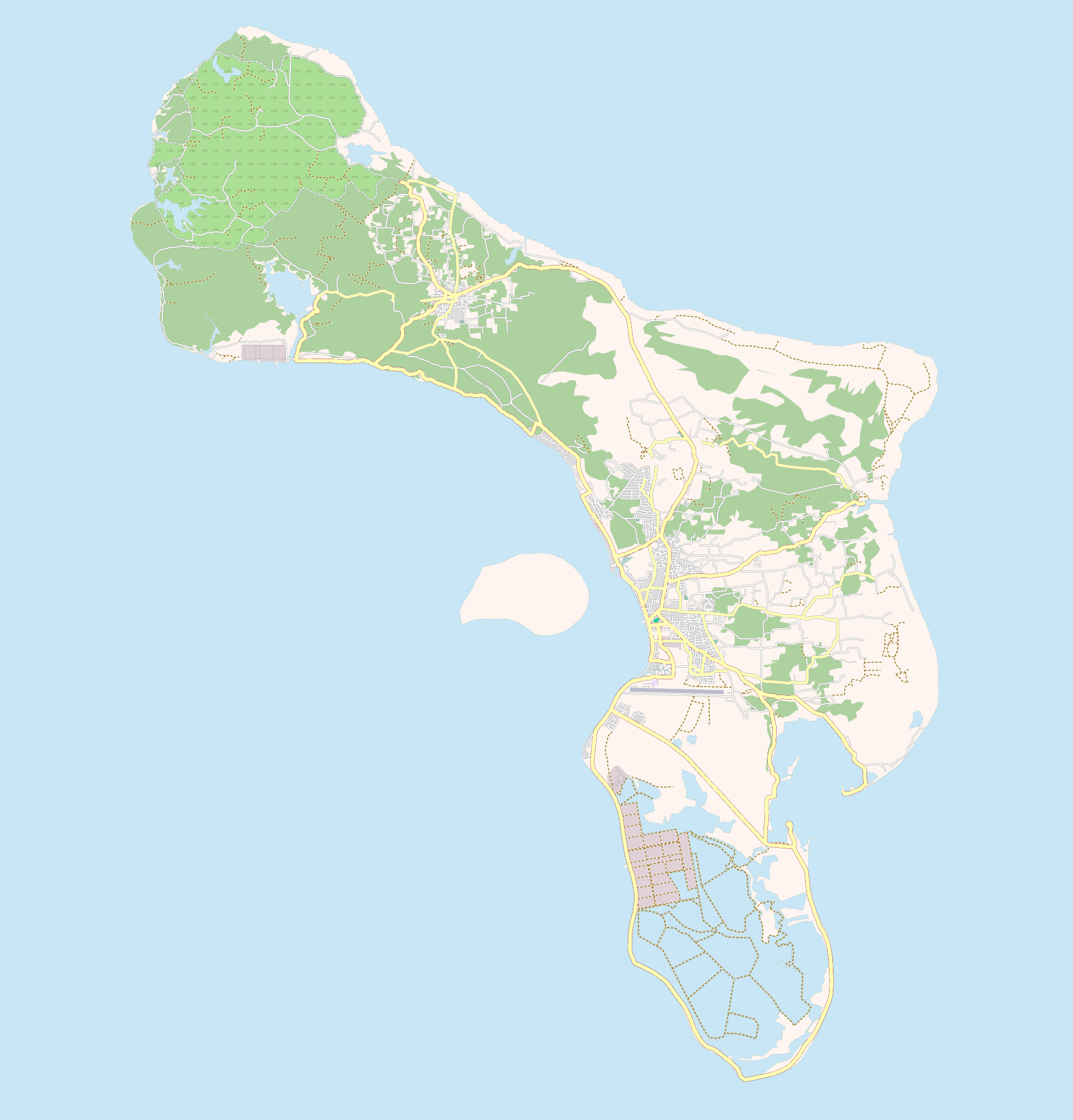
- Location within Bonaire Location within North America
- Coordinates: 12°8′40″N 68°15′56″W
- Country: Netherlands
- Public body: Bonaire

Area
  - Total: 31.1 km^{2} (12.0 sq mi)

Population (2017)
  - Total: 10,620
  - Density: 341/km^{2} (884/sq mi)
- Time zone: UTC-04:00 (AST)
  - Summer (DST): (Not Observed)
- ISO 3166 code: BQ-BO; NL-BQ1
- Climate: BSh

Kralendijk (Dutch pronunciation: [ˈkraːlə(n)dɛik]) is the capital and the main port of the island of Bonaire in the Caribbean Netherlands. The language spoken in the town is Papiamentu, but Dutch and English are widely used. As of 2017, the town had a population of 10,620. In Papiamentu, the town is often called Playa or "beach".

Off the coast of Kralendijk lies the uninhabited island of Klein Bonaire, noted for diving and snorkeling activities. This small island can be reached by water taxi, or, for divers, by practically all of the local dive operators.

== Etymology ==
Kralendijk is an alteration of the Dutch word Koralendijk, which means "coral dike."

== History ==
Fort Oranje was built in 1639 to defend Bonaire's main harbor. The fort was extensively modified around the end of the seventeenth century. The English settlement of "Playa" was established adjacent to the fort in 1810. The town was named "Kralendijk" by the Dutch colonial rulers in 1830.

On May 10, 1940, 461 Dutch and German citizens were transported to Bonaire and interned in a camp just south of the fort. After World War II, this camp was converted into a hotel, which is now the Divi Bonaire.

The town of Kralendijk is a result of the merger of five villages: Antriol (Entrejol), Nikiboko, Noord Saliña, Playa, and Tera Kora.

== Sights and activities ==
The Tourism Corporation Bonaire has a "Historical Walking Tour" brochure that lists 25 historical sites in the downtown area:

1. World War II Monument. In memory of the Bonaireans who lost their lives during the war. Most were killed when German submarines sank oil tankers that were manned by men from the Netherlands Antilles. Bonaire lost more sailors than any of the other Dutch islands.
2. Pasangrahan. Built about 1890 as the home of the Debrot family. In 1921, it was converted into a government guest house of visiting officials. Later it became the office of the water supply and public works. It was restored, and then reopened in 1980 as the Island Parliament House where the island council meets.
3. Wilhelmina Park. This park is named after Queen Wilhelmina of the Netherlands.
4. Protestant Church. This congregation was established in 1843. The church was built in 1847, mainly for Dutch living on Bonaire. The church tower was added in 1868.
5. 'Van Walbeeck Monument. This 1934 monument commemorates the 300th anniversary of Johannes van Walbeeck, the first director of the Dutch West India Company in Curaçao and first governor of the Netherlands Antilles.
6. Eleanor Roosevelt Monument. This monument is in honor of Mrs. Roosevelt's visit to the American troops on Bonaire in World War II.
7. Welcome Seat. This bench was dedicated on August 31, 1923. This is a place where people would sit and wait for family and friends coming from Curaçao. The plaque is dedicated to Queen Wilhelmina of the Netherlands. The "W" shape refers to "welcome" and "Wilhelmina."
8. Customs Building. This building was built in 1925 as the Island Office. Over the years, it served as the tax collector's office, the customs office, and the post office. It was vacated in 1995 for restoration. It is now a customs office again.
9. Government Office Building. This building was constructed in 1837 as the governor's home. It was restored in 1972, and is now the island government's main office building.
10. Fort Oranje. This fort was built in 1639. The commander of the island lived here until 1837 when his new home was built next door. The fort never saw action. The cannons are old English cannons that date between 1808 and 1812. The fort building was restored in 1999, and was home to the courthouse until 2011.
11. Within Fort Orange, a wooden lighthouse was built around 1868, and replaced by a stone structure in 1932. The Kralendijk Lighthouse building has been used over the years as a government center and warehouse for government goods, as a prison, and a police and fire station.
12. Betico Croes Monument. This monument and bust commemorates Betico Croes who led the struggle for "Status Aparte" on the island of Aruba.
13. Post Office. The first post office was established in 1890, and moved to this building in 1974. It was recently restored.
14. Tourist Information Office. A report in 1956 indicated that tourism could become the main source of income for Bonaire. Information on Kralendijk and Bonaire is available here.
15. Telephone Company (TELBO). The first telegraph connection with Curaçao was in 1911. The telephone lines were laid to Rincon in 1921. The construction of the telephone began in 1944, and became automatic in 1961. In 1975, Bonaire was the first Dutch island to direct dial internationally. In 1999, Bonaire had its first fiber optic connection via cable under the sea.
16. Simón Bolívar monument and bust. This monument commemorates the Liberator's 1816 visit to Bonaire while seeking safety during the Venezuelan War of Independence.
17. Museo Boneriano. This museum contains different artifacts from the past of Bonaire.
18. St. Bernardus Church. This parish dedicated to Saint Bernard was established in 1827. The original building was built in 1829, and then replaced in 1848. The church complex included the home of the priest.
19. Plaza Fraternan di Tilburg. This monument is dedicated to the Fraters of Tilburg who were involved with education on the island from 1894 to 1991.
20. Julianaplein. This is a small park in honor of Queen Juliana of the Netherlands.
21. Former St. Franciscus (Saint Francis of Assisi) Convent. The Sisters of Roosendaal started a school here in 1856 where about 30 girls from Bonaire became Catholic sisters. All the Dutch Sisters now have returned to the Netherlands, and the Bonairean Sisters now live within the community. Behind the convent is a chapel and home for the elderly.
22. Old Hospital. Built in 1922 and restored in 1944. Since the opening of the modern hospital in 1977, the building has been used for offices and the elderly.
23. Chapel at the Old Hospital. This chapel welcomes visitors of all religions.
24. Historical cannons. These cannons are located across the street from the Old Hospital. They are from a British ship that ran aground in 1829 near Oranje Pond. The anchor was found in the same general area.
25. Main shopping street (Kaya Grandi). This shopping street has various architecture in many styles from the late 1800s and 1900s. The shopkeepers lived upstairs and the businesses were on the ground floor.
26. Fish Market. Built in 1935 as a market place for fishermen. Now a fruit and vegetable boat comes from Venezuela weekly. The Venezuelan men sell the produce in the old fish market.

The "Public Beach", also known as Windsock, is located 1.5 kilometres (0.9 miles) south of downtown at the west end of the runway of the Flamingo International Airport. Another public beach is at the site of the Bonaire Sunset Beach Hotel about two kilometres (1.2 miles) north of downtown.

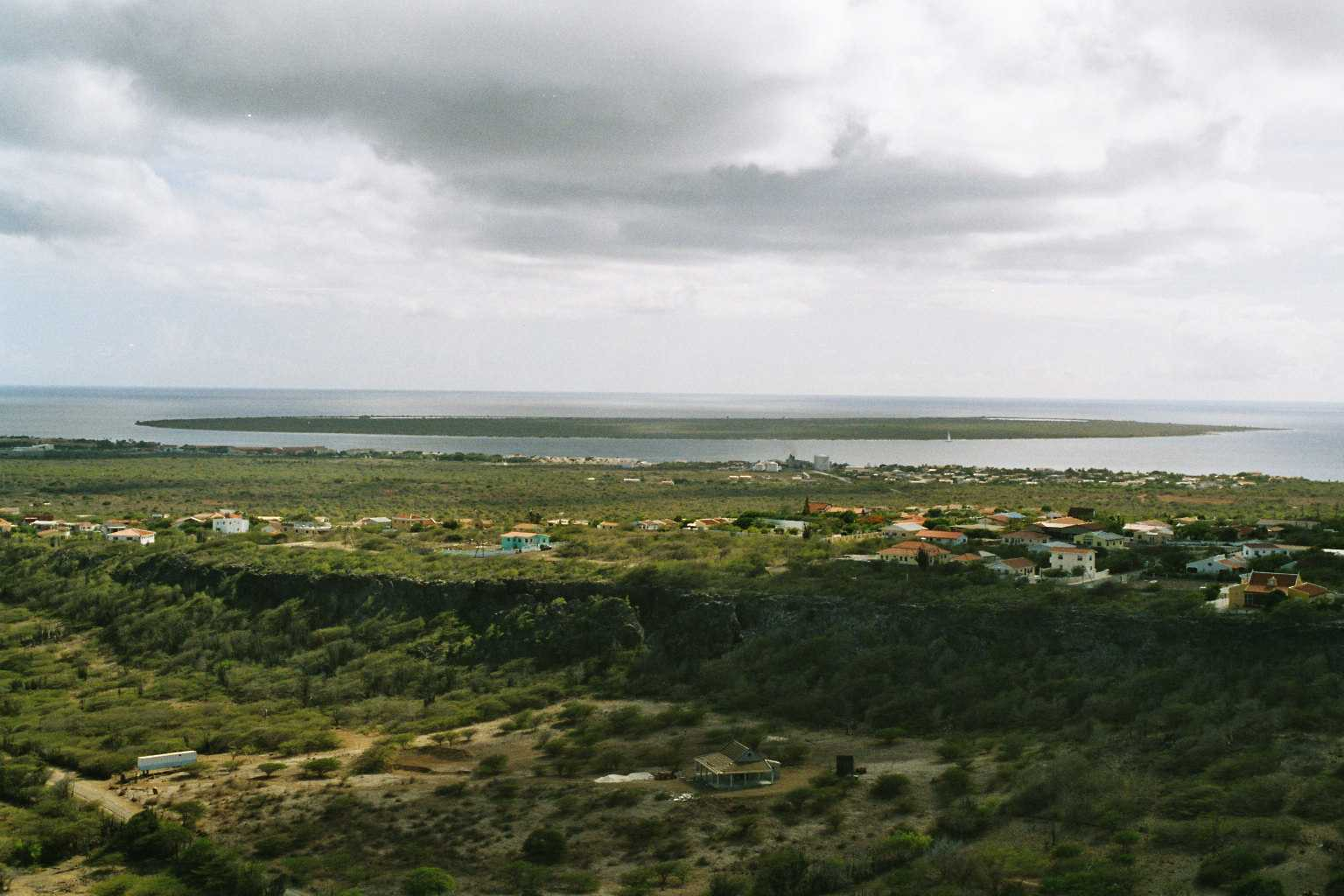
View of Kralendijk and Klein Bonaire from Seru Largu.

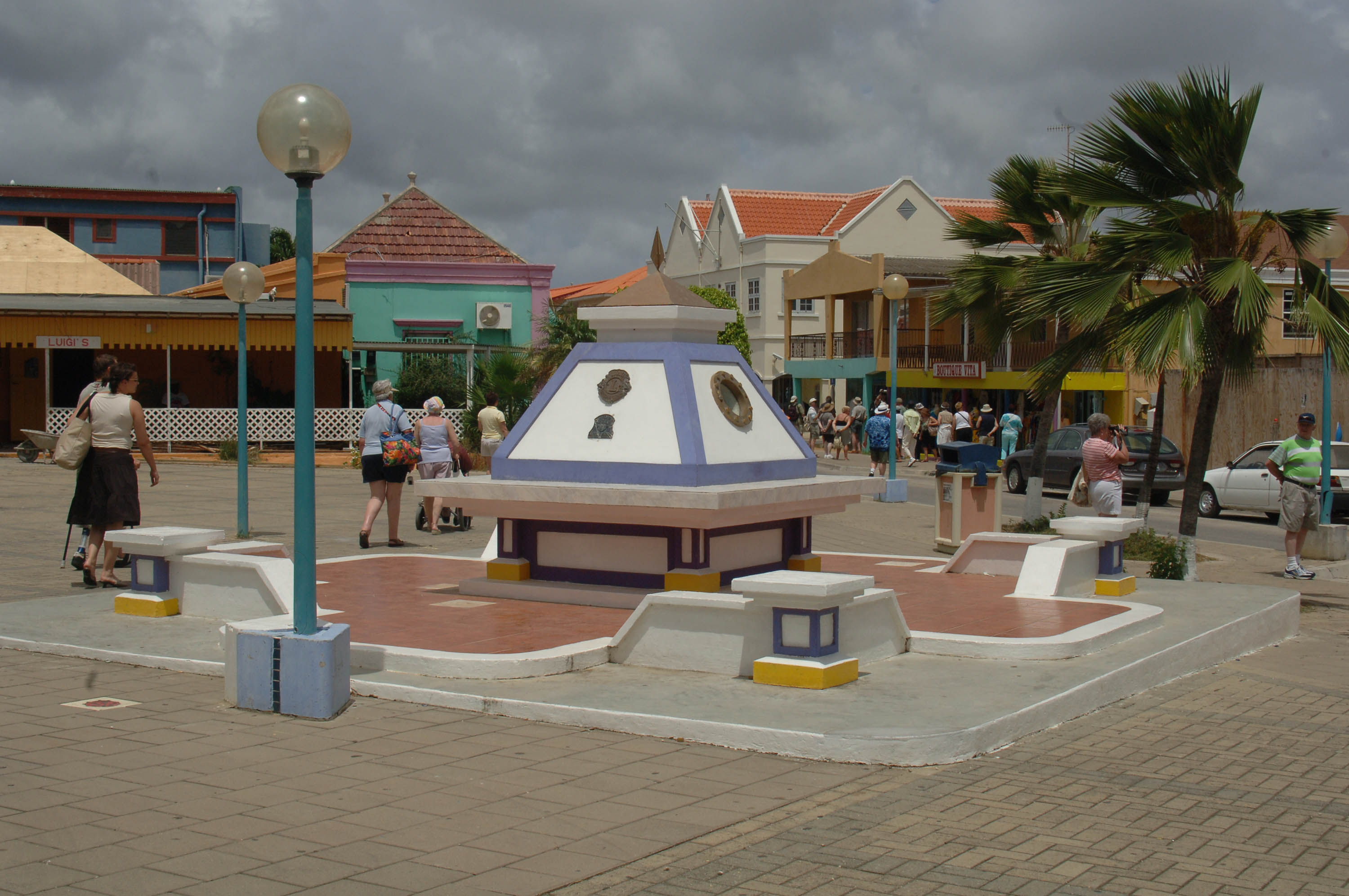
Wilhelmina Park.

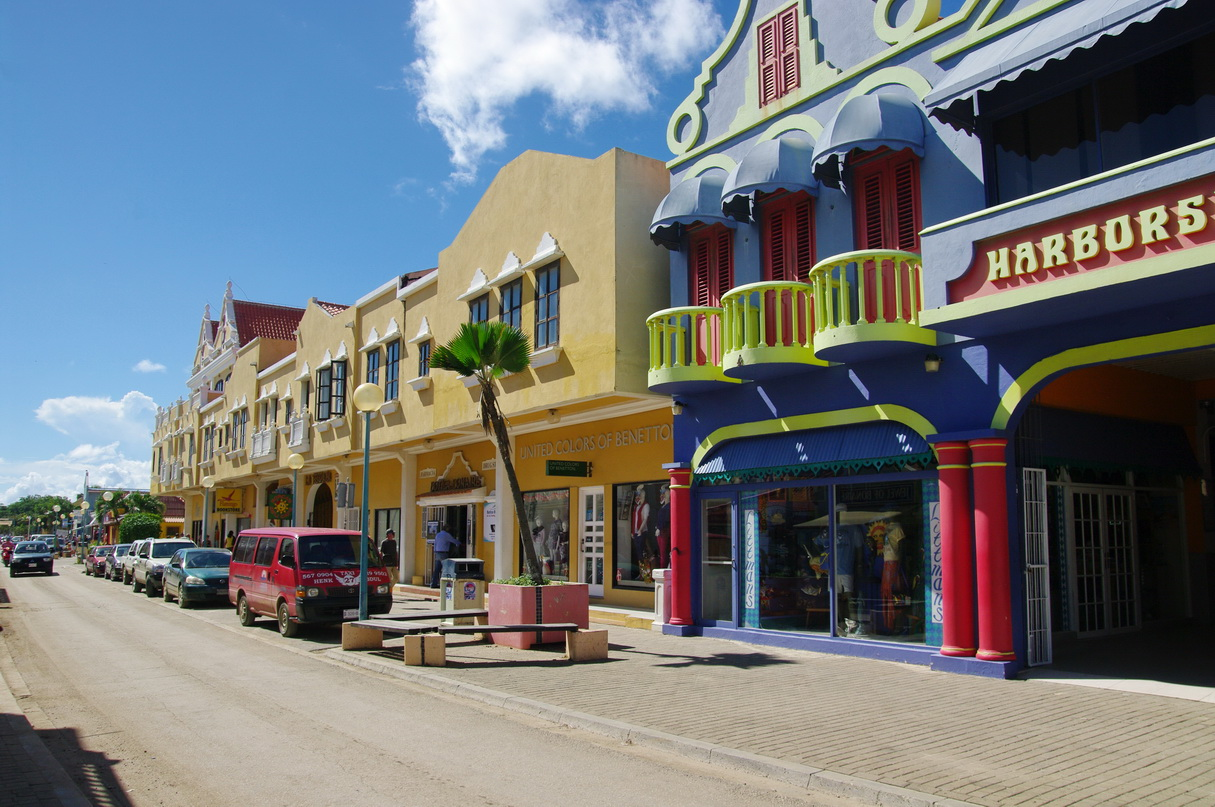
Downtown Bonaire.

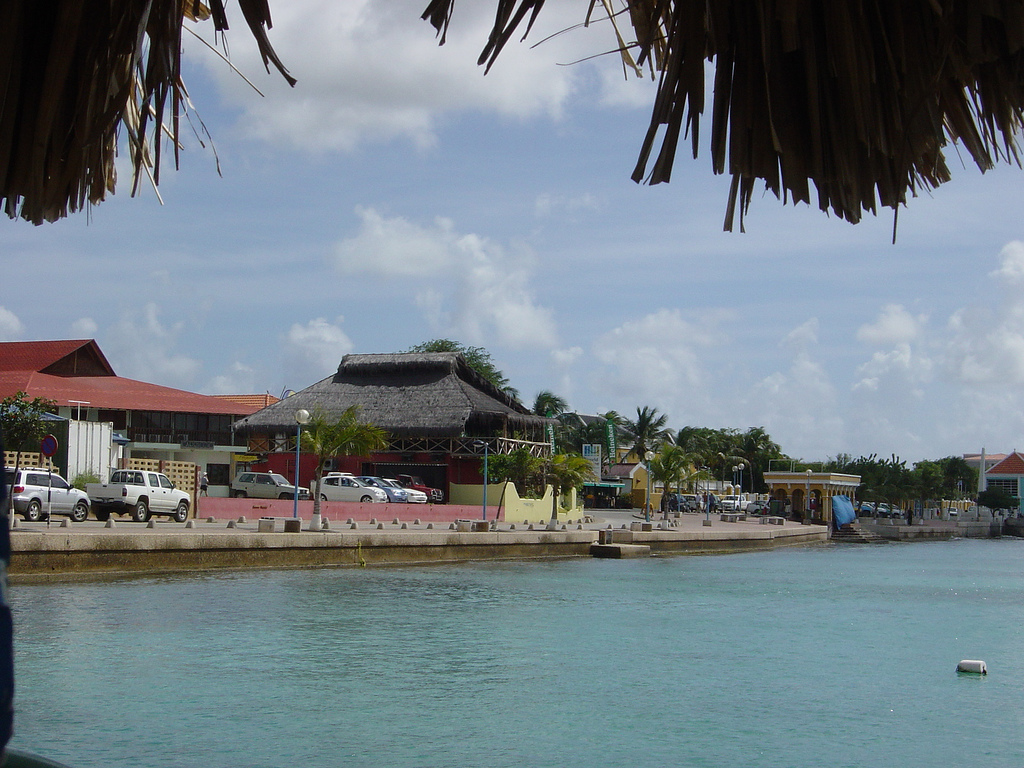
View of waterfront including Fish Market and World War II Monument on the right.

== Climate ==
Kralendijk has a hot semi-arid climate (Köppen BSh) with uniformly hot, humid but dry weather due to the divergence between the trade winds and the North American Monsoon, along with a strong drying effect from winds parallel to the coast of South America. There is a short rainy season between October and January due to stronger northeasterly flow during the retreat of the monsoon; however it is erratic and heavily influenced by the Southern Oscillation, frequently failing completely during El Niño years. During La Niña years, however, rainfall may reach up to 1,000 millimetres (39 in) over a year and over 350 millimetres (14 in) in a month as happened during 1970/1971, 1988/1989, 1999/2000, 2010/2011 and 2022/2023.

Climate data for Kralendijk (Flamingo International Airport) 1971–2000
| Month | Jan | Feb | Mar | Apr | May | Jun | Jul | Aug | Sep | Oct | Nov | Dec | Year |
|---|---|---|---|---|---|---|---|---|---|---|---|---|---|
| Record high °C (°F) | 32.0 (89.6) | 33.0 (91.4) | 34.2 (93.6) | 35.4 (95.7) | 36.2 (97.2) | 35.4 (95.7) | 34.4 (93.9) | 36.7 (98.1) | 36.7 (98.1) | 35.1 (95.2) | 34.1 (93.4) | 32.7 (90.9) | 36.7 (98.1) |
| Mean daily maximum °C (°F) | 29.5 (85.1) | 29.7 (85.5) | 30.0 (86.0) | 30.4 (86.7) | 31.0 (87.8) | 31.2 (88.2) | 31.1 (88.0) | 31.6 (88.9) | 31.9 (89.4) | 31.7 (89.1) | 31.0 (87.8) | 30.0 (86.0) | 30.8 (87.4) |
| Daily mean °C (°F) | 26.7 (80.1) | 26.8 (80.2) | 27.1 (80.8) | 27.5 (81.5) | 28.2 (82.8) | 28.5 (83.3) | 28.4 (83.1) | 28.9 (84.0) | 29.1 (84.4) | 28.8 (83.8) | 28.2 (82.8) | 27.3 (81.1) | 28.0 (82.4) |
| Mean daily minimum °C (°F) | 24.4 (75.9) | 24.5 (76.1) | 24.8 (76.6) | 25.4 (77.7) | 26.2 (79.2) | 26.4 (79.5) | 26.2 (79.2) | 26.5 (79.7) | 26.5 (79.7) | 26.3 (79.3) | 25.7 (78.3) | 25.0 (77.0) | 25.7 (78.3) |
| Record low °C (°F) | 20.2 (68.4) | 19.8 (67.6) | 18.9 (66.0) | 20.6 (69.1) | 21.2 (70.2) | 20.4 (68.7) | 19.2 (66.6) | 21.2 (70.2) | 21.4 (70.5) | 20.6 (69.1) | 19.4 (66.9) | 20.2 (68.4) | 18.9 (66.0) |
| Average rainfall mm (inches) | 44.4 (1.75) | 18.3 (0.72) | 13.2 (0.52) | 13.2 (0.52) | 14.8 (0.58) | 14.4 (0.57) | 36.3 (1.43) | 35.0 (1.38) | 37.0 (1.46) | 67.3 (2.65) | 95.9 (3.78) | 73.6 (2.90) | 463.3 (18.24) |
| Average rainy days (≥ 1.0 mm) | 9.2 | 4.4 | 2.5 | 1.8 | 1.7 | 2.8 | 5.6 | 4.4 | 5.0 | 7.6 | 11.5 | 10.8 | 67.3 |
| Average relative humidity (%) | 75.2 | 74.6 | 74.2 | 75.4 | 76.4 | 76.2 | 76.9 | 76.0 | 75.1 | 76.1 | 77.3 | 76.6 | 75.9 |
Source: Meteorological Department Curaçao

== Transportation ==
Kralendijk is served by Flamingo International Airport and a cruise ship terminal. Taxis are available in town and at the airport. There is no public bus service, but collective taxis run between Kralendijk and Rincon. Car rentals are available at the airport. Bicycle and scooter rentals are available in town. Water taxi service goes to Klein Bonaire and several resort areas departing from the centre of Kralendijk.

== Economy ==
Previously Dutch Antilles Express, a now-defunct airline, had its head office in the Plasa Medardo SV Thielman in Kralendijk. In April 2007 the airline moved its head office from Bonaire to Curaçao, where the airline's flight operations had been based. The airline's call centre and its revenue accounting and handling departments remained in Bonaire.

== Notable people ==
- Gerritson Craane (1994), footballer.
- Cola Debrot (1902–1981), writer and Governor of the Netherlands Antilles.

== See also ==
- Schunck's Kledingindustrie Bonaire
- St. Bernard Church
- List of lighthouses in Bonaire
