= Kralendijk Lighthouse =

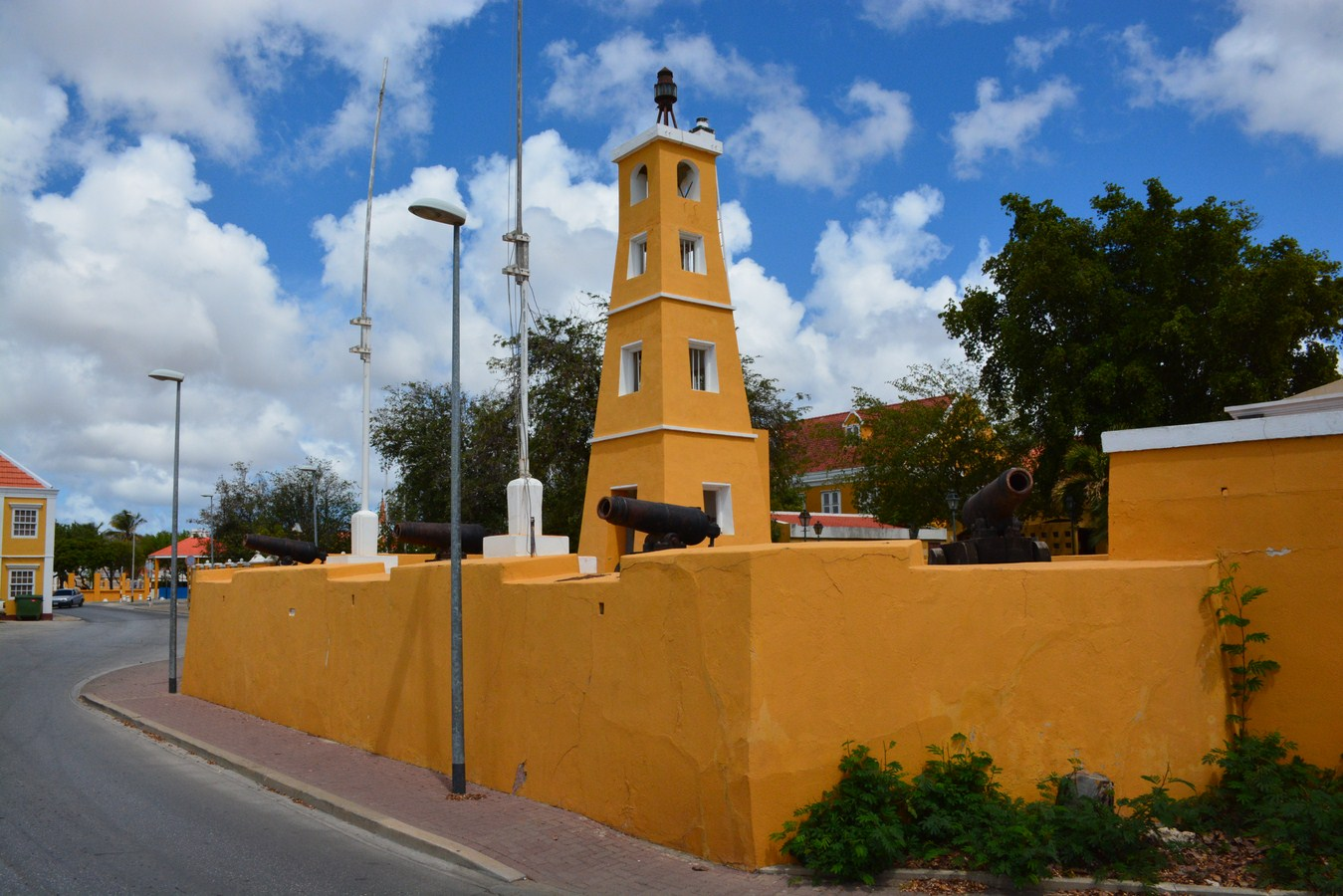
- Location: Bonaire, Kralendijk, Bonaire, Kralendijk, Netherlands
- Coordinates: 12°08′56″N 68°16′37″W

Tower
- Constructed: 1837 (first)
- Construction: stone tower
- Height: 7 metres (23 ft)
- Shape: square tapered truncated tower with balcony and light
- Markings: ochre tower
- Power source: mains electricity

Light
- First lit: 1932 (current)
- Focal height: 13 metres (43 ft)
- Range: 5 nautical miles (9.3 km; 5.8 mi)
- Characteristic: Fl W 2s.

Kralendijk Lighthouse (or Fort Oranje Lighthouse) is an active lighthouse in the town of Kralendijk, Bonaire, in the Caribbean Netherlands. It was built in 1932 on the grounds of Fort Oranje, a 17th century fort.

== History ==
In 1639, the Dutch West India Company constructed Fort Oranje (or Oranje Battery), which served as a military fortress until 1837. Around 1868, a wooden lighthouse tower was built inside the walls of the fort.

In 1932, a stone lighthouse was constructed in place of the wooden lighthouse. The building and its light are still operational today.The lighthouse sits near the island's port, across from the cruise terminal. It now serves as the harbor master's office. It is managed by the Bonaire Port Authority.

== Description ==
The lighthouse is a 4-story stone pyramidal tower with a square base, with a 7 m high terrace and modern beacon. The lighthouse is painted tan and the beacon is black. It emits, at a focal height of 13 m, a brief white flash of 0.2 seconds per 2 second period. Its range is 5 nautical miles (approximately 9 km).

Identifier : ARLHS : NEA-007 - Admiralty : J6408.3 - NGA : 110-16093 .

== Light characteristic ==
Frequency : 2 seconds (W)

- Light : 0.2 seconds
- Darkness : 1.8 seconds

== Gallery ==
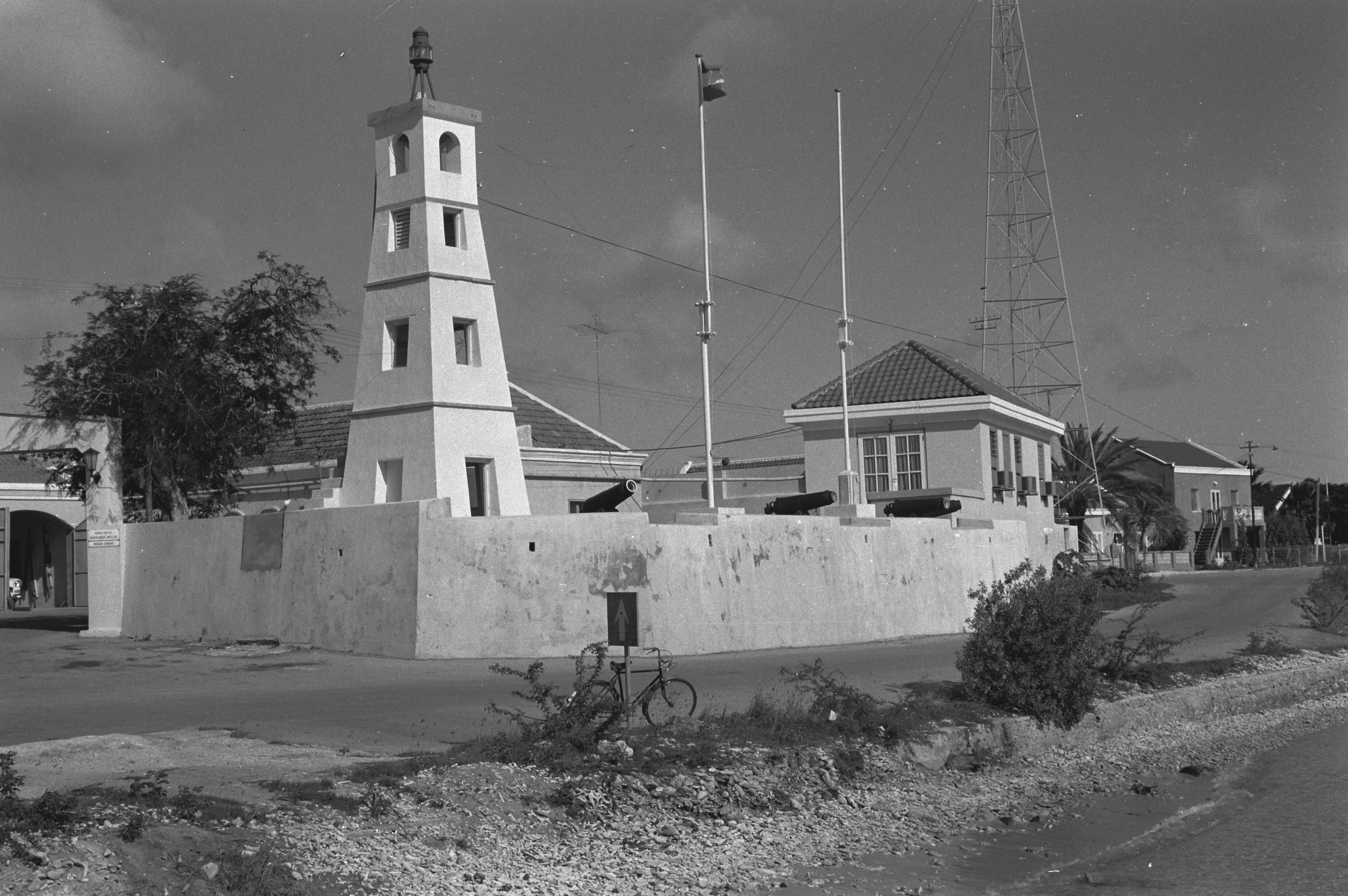
Lighthouse within the walls of Fort Oranje

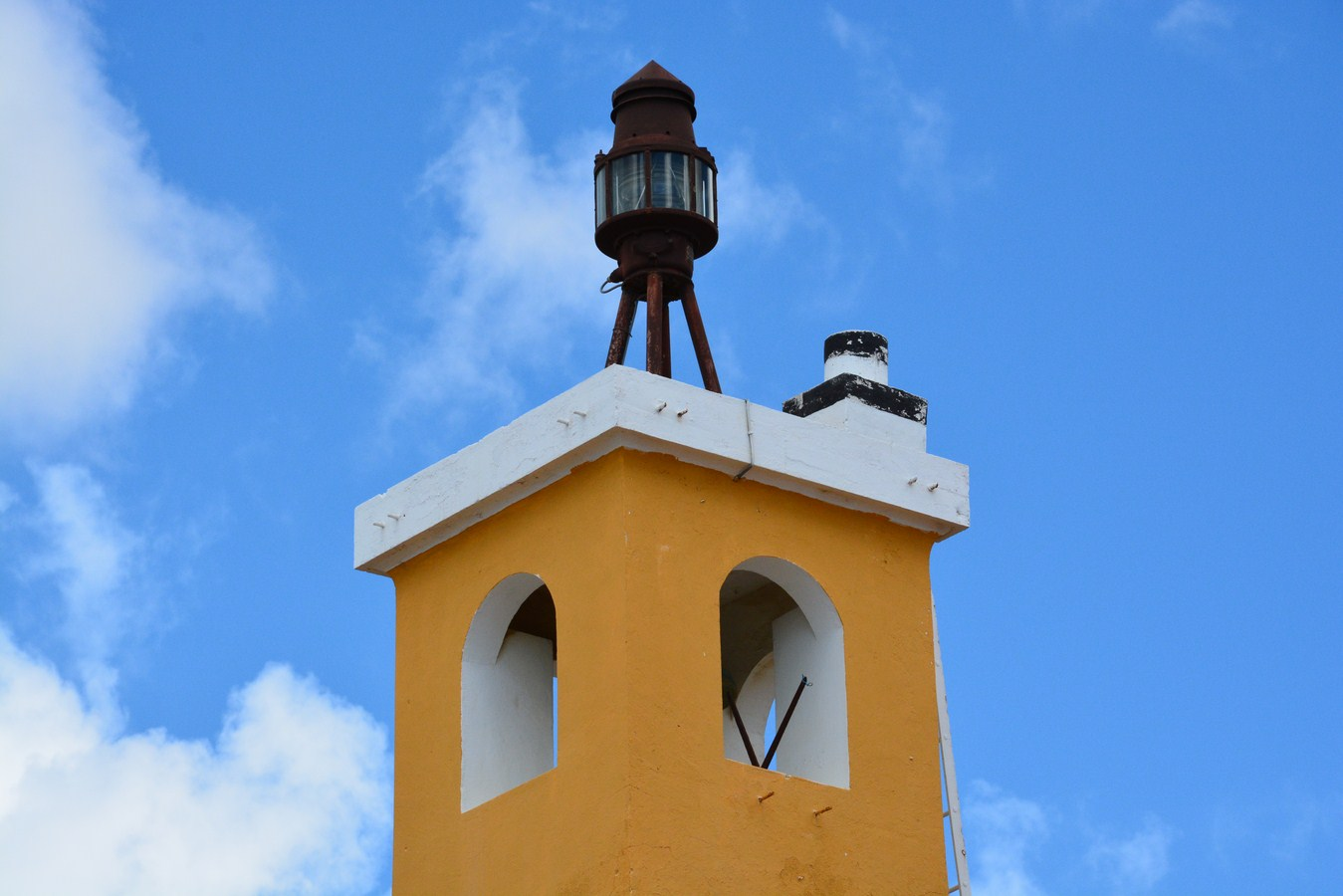
Beacon (lamp) at the top of the lighthouse

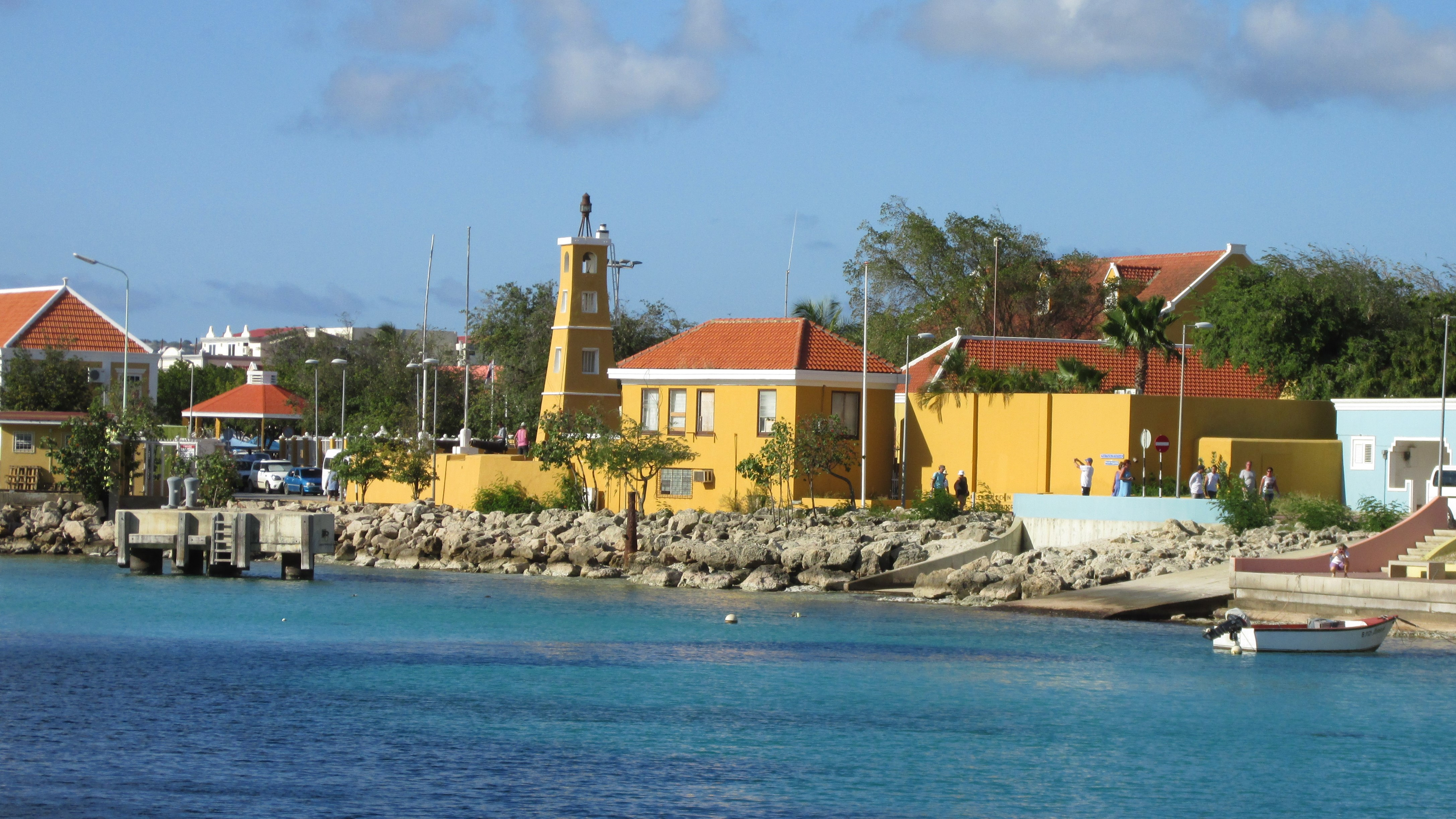
Lighthouse and fort seen from the harbor

== See also ==
- Fort Orange
- List of lighthouses in Bonaire
