= Basilica of St. Anne, Willemstad =

Basilica of St. Anne
- Basilika Santa Ana; Basiliek Santa Ana
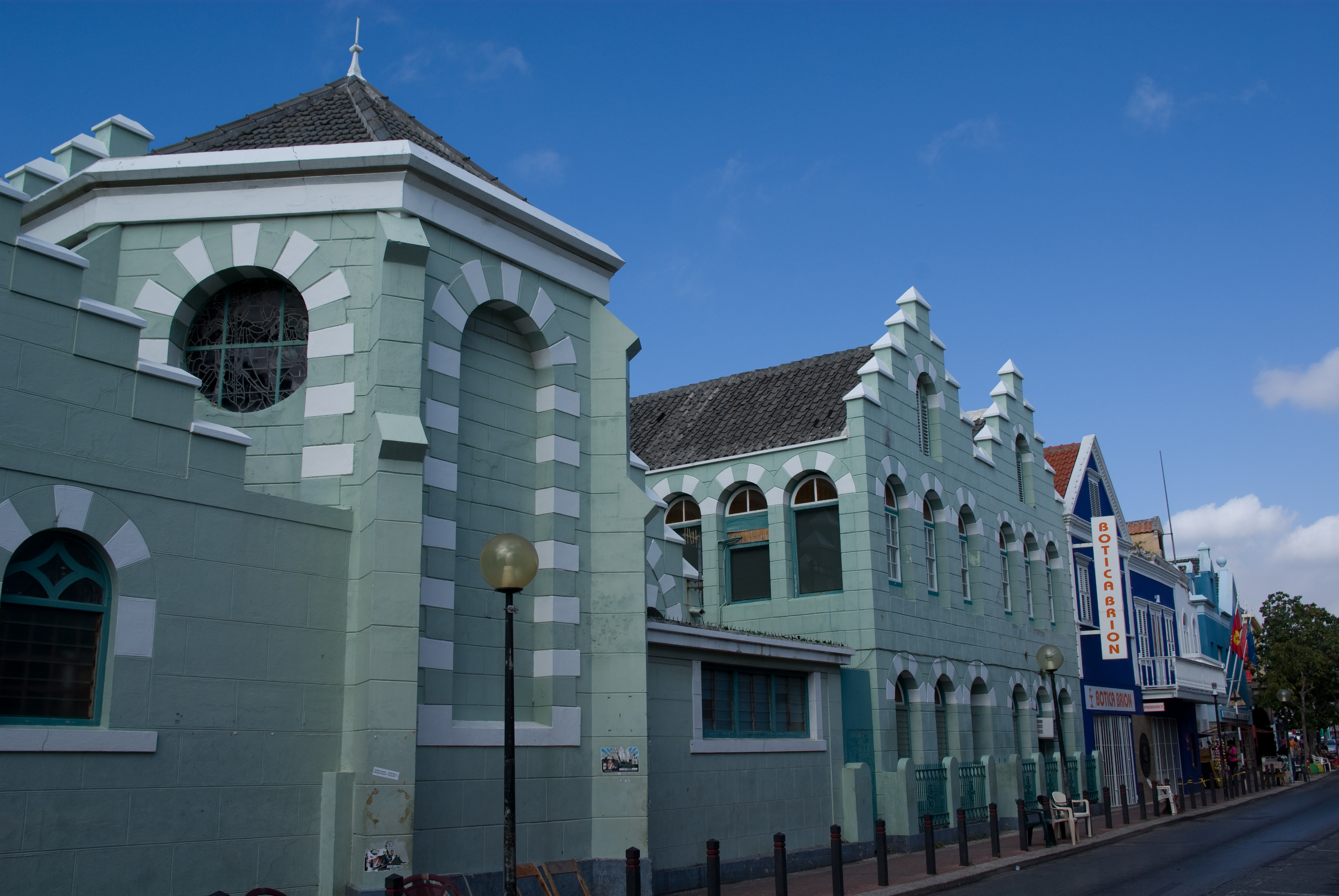
- Basilica of St. Anne
- 12°6′30″N 68°56′11.5″W
- Location: Willemstad; Curaçao
- Country: Netherlands
- Denomination: Catholic Church

The Basilica of St. Anne (Papiamento: Basilika Santa Ana; Dutch: Basiliek Santa Ana) is a religious building that functions as Catholic Minor Basilica and at the same time as co-cathedral of the Diocese of Willemstad (Latin: Dioecesis Gulielmopolitana) on the island of Curaçao in the Caribbean Sea off the coast of Venezuela, the other being the main cathedral dedicated to Our Lady the Queen of the Holy Rosary of the same city.

It was built between 1734 and 1752 in the sector of Otrabanda and received its present status in 1975 by decision of Pope Paul VI. Previously between 1843 and 1958 it held the title of pro-cathedral also granted by the Holy See. It follows the Roman or Latin rite and is one of the world's smallest basilica churches.

It is a world heritage site by Unesco since 1997 when it was registered as part of the Historic Area of the city and port of Willemstad.

== See also ==
- Catholic Church in the Dutch Caribbean
- Roman Catholic Diocese of Willemstad
