= Diocese of Willemstad =

Latin Catholic ecclesiastical jurisdiction in the Caribbean

Coordinates: 12.1081°N 68.9369°W

Diocese of Willemstad Dioecesis Gulielmopolitana Bisdom Willemstad

Catholic
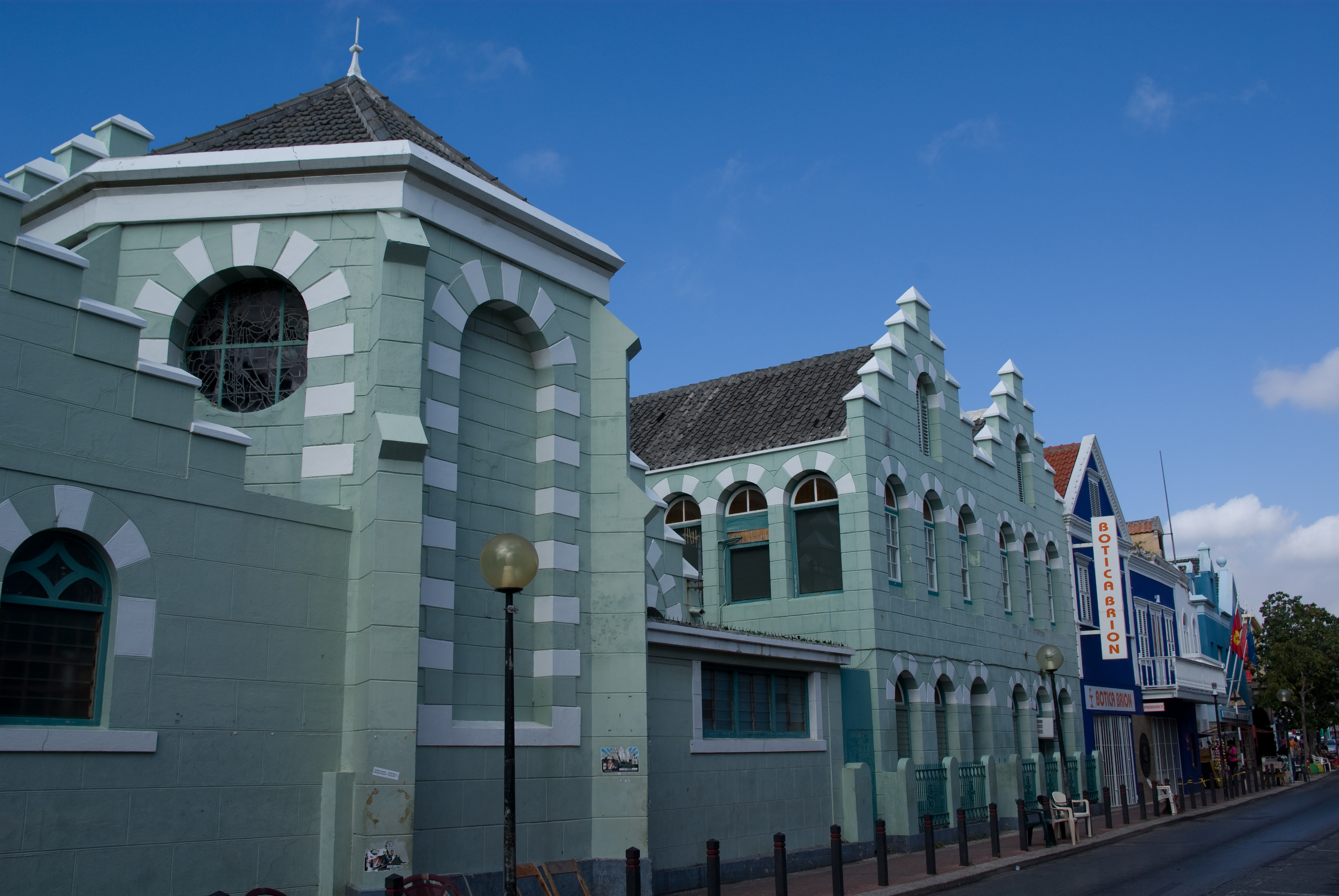
- Basilica of St. Anne in Willemstad, Curaçao

Location
- Country: Aruba (NL); Curaçao (NL); Sint Maarten (NL); Caribbean Netherlands
- Ecclesiastical province: Port of Spain
- Metropolitan: Port of Spain

Statistics
- Area: 993 km^{2} (383 sq mi)
- Population: Total; Catholics: (as of 2008); 295,264; 217,851 (73.8%)

Information
- Denomination: Catholic
- Rite: Latin Rite
- Established: 1758 (as Apostolic Prefecture of Curaçao); 1842 Apostolic Vicariate of Curaçao; 1958 Diocese of Willemstad
- Cathedral: Cathedral of Our Lady of the Holy Rosary in Willemstad

Current leadership
- Pope: Leo XIV
- Bishop: sede vacante
- Metropolitan Archbishop: Joseph Everard Harris

Map
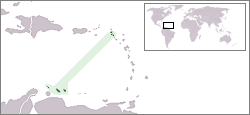

Website
- Website of the Diocese

The Diocese of Willemstad (Latin: Dioecesis Gulielmopolitana; Dutch: Bisdom Willemstad; Papiamento: Diosesano (di Obispado) di Willemstad) is a diocese of the Latin Church of the Catholic Church in the Caribbean. The diocese encompasses the territory of the Kingdom of the Netherlands in the Caribbean: the countries (Dutch: landen) Aruba, Curaçao, Sint Maarten (the southern half of St. Martin) and the islands Bonaire, St. Eustatius, Saba (which are part of the Netherlands). The cathedra is in the city of Curaçao. The diocese is a suffragan of the Archdiocese of Port of Spain, and a member of the Antilles Episcopal Conference.

The language spoken in many of the Catholic churches here is Papiamento and English. The diocese has maintained a website in this language and in English. Some priests are members of the Society of the Divine Word (SVD), Order of Preachers (OP), Michaelites (CSMA), and Salesians of Don Bosco (SDB).

== History ==
The Diocese of Willemstad was erected in 1752 as the Prefecture Apostolic of Curaçao. It was elevated to become an apostolic vicariate by Pope Gregory XVI on 20 September 1842, in recognition of its growth as a mission, which became the Diocese of Willemstad on 28 April 1958.

== Bishops ==
=== Ordinaries ===
- Martinus Johannes Niewindt (1823-1860)
- Johannes Fredericus Antonius Kistemaker O.P. (1860-1869)
- Petrus Hendricus Josephus van Ewyk, O.P. (1869–1886)
- Ceslaus H. J. Heynen (1886–1887)
- Alphonsus M. H. Joosten (1888–1896)
- Ambrosius Jacobus J. van Baars, O.P. (1897–1910)
- Michael Antonio Maria Vuylsteke, O.P. (1910–1930)
- Pietro Giovanni Umberto Verriet, O.P. (1931–1948)
- Antonio Ludovico van der Veen Zeppenfeldt, O.P. (1948–1956)
- Joannes Maria Michael Holterman, O.P. (1956–1973)
- Wilhelm Michel Ellis (1973–2001)
- Luis Antonio Secco, S.D.B. (Salesians of Don Bosco) (2001– 7 January 2025)

=== Coadjutor bishops ===
- Johannes Fredericus Antonius Kistemaker O.P. (1852-1860) as Coadjutor Vicar Apostolic
- Luis Antonio Secco, S.D.B. (Salesians of Don Bosco) (2000-2001)

== Catholic churches and parishes ==
Listed by island (alphabetically), neighborhood (alphabetically), and church name and full address:

=== Island of Aruba ===
1. Brasil: Cristo Rey, Brasil 39, Brasil, Aruba
2. Dakota: La Birgen di Fatima, Milonstraat 9, Dakota, Oranjestad, Aruba
3. Madiki: Cristo Sufriente Chapel (Madiki Chapel), Belgiestraat Madiki 29, Madiki, Oranjestad, Aruba
4. Noord: Santa Ana, Caya Frans Figaroa Noord 16, Noord, Aruba; La Birgen di Alto Vista Chapel (Pilgrims Chapel), Alto Vista, Noord, Aruba
5. Oranjestad: San Francisco di Asis, J. Irausquinplein 3, Oranjestad, Aruba
6. Paradera: Santa Filomena, Paradera 51, Paradera, Aruba
7. Pos Chikito: Santa Familia Chapel, Pos Chikito, Savaneta, Aruba
8. San Nicolaas: Santa Teresita di Niño Hesus, Theresiaplein 8, Bernhardstraat, San Nicolaas, Aruba; Emanuel Chapel, Rooi Hondu, San Nicolaas, Aruba
9. Santa Cruz: Inmaculada Concepcion, Santa Cruz 41, Santa Cruz, Aruba
10. Savaneta: Sagrado Curazon di Hesus, Savaneta 338-D, Savaneta, Aruba
11. Tanki Leendert: San Papa Juan Pablo II, Rte. 4, Tanki Leendert, Oranjestad, Aruba; Monte Calvario Chapel, Rte. 4, Tanki Leendert, Oranjestad, Aruba

=== Island of Bonaire ===
1. Antriol: La Birgen di Coromoto, Pastorie Antriol, Kaya Korona 126, Bonaire
2. Bonaire: St. Louis Bertrand Church
3. Kralendijk: San Bernardo, Pastorie Kralendijk, Plaza Reina Juliana 2, Bonaire
4. Rincon: San Ludovico Beltran, Pastorie Rincon, Bonaire NA

=== Island of Curaçao ===
1. Barber: San José
2. Brievengat: La Birgen di Lourdes, Willemstad
3. Buena Vista: La Birgen Milagrosa
4. Groot Kwartier: La Birgen del Carmen
5. Jandoret: Mama di Bon Conseho, Station: Boca San Michiel: San Miguel Archangel; Souax: La Birgen di Guadalupe
6. Janwe: Sagrado Curazon di Hesus
7. Koraal Specht: Bon Wardador
8. Montagne: San Dominico. Station: Fuik: San Francisco
9. Otrabanda: Santa Ana Minor Basilica, Willemstad
10. Pietermaai Cathedral: Reina di Santisimo Rosario (Queen of the Most Holy Rosary) Cathedral, Willemstad
11. San Mateo: Santa Familia, Willemstad
12. Sint Willibrordus: San Willibrordo
13. Santa Maria: Maria Auxiliadora, Willemstad
14. Santa Rosa: Santa Rosa de Lima
15. Seru Fortuna: San Martin de Porres
16. Soto: San Antonio de Padua, Soto
17. Steenrijk: La Birgen di Altagracia, Willemstad
18. Suffisant: La Birgen di Fatima
19. Tera Korà: Spiritu Santo, Kaya Andesit 66, Tera Korà,
20. Westpunt: San Pedro. Lagoen: Station: San Juan Apostle, Pastorie Westpunt,
21. Wishi: Hesús Misericordioso y Santa Teresita, Schottegatweg West. 33, Wishi
22. Zuid-Bonam: San Hudas Tadeo, Ronde Klipweg 61, P.O. Box 3909, Zuid-Bona

=== Island of Saba ===
1. The Bottom: Sacred Heart Church
2. Windwardside: St Paul's Conversion
3. Zion's Hill: Queen of the Holy Rosary Church

=== Island of Sint Eustatius ===
1. Oranjestad: St Eustatius Catholic Church

=== Island of Sint Maarten (the southern half of St. Martin) ===
1. Philipsburg: St Martin of Tours
2. Simpson Bay: Mary Star of the Sea
3. South Reward: The Risen Christ

== See also ==
- List of Roman Catholic Dioceses in the Caribbean
- Roman Catholicism in the Kingdom of the Netherlands in the Caribbean

== Sources ==
- Antilles Episcopal Conference, Roman Catholic Bishops' Conference of the Antilles
- "Diocese of Willemstad". Catholic-Hierarchy.
- Roman Catholic Diocese of Willemstad official site in English
