= St. Philomena's Church =

St. Philomena's Church or St. Philomena Catholic Church may refer to:

in India

- St. Philomena's Church, Mysore, India

in the United States

(by state)

- Saint Philomena Catholic Church in Honolulu, Hawaii
- St. Philomena Catholic Church - Kalawao, Hawaii
- St. Philomena Catholic Church - Peoria, Illinois
- St. Philomena's Church - Labadieville, Louisiana
- St. Philomena Catholic Church - Detroit
- St. Philomena's Cathedral and Rectory, Omaha, Nebraska, listed on the NRHP in Nebraska
- St. Philomena Catholic Church - Livingston, New Jersey
- St. Philomena's Church (Cincinnati, Ohio)
- Saint Philomena's Church (Lansdowne)
- St. Philomena's Church (Pittsburgh)
- St. Philomena Catholic Church - Des Moines, Washington
- St. Philomena's Roman Catholic Church, Franklinville, New York
