= Fort Orange (Bonaire) =

Fort in Kralendijk, Bonaire

- Fort Oranje
- Kralendijk, Bonaire
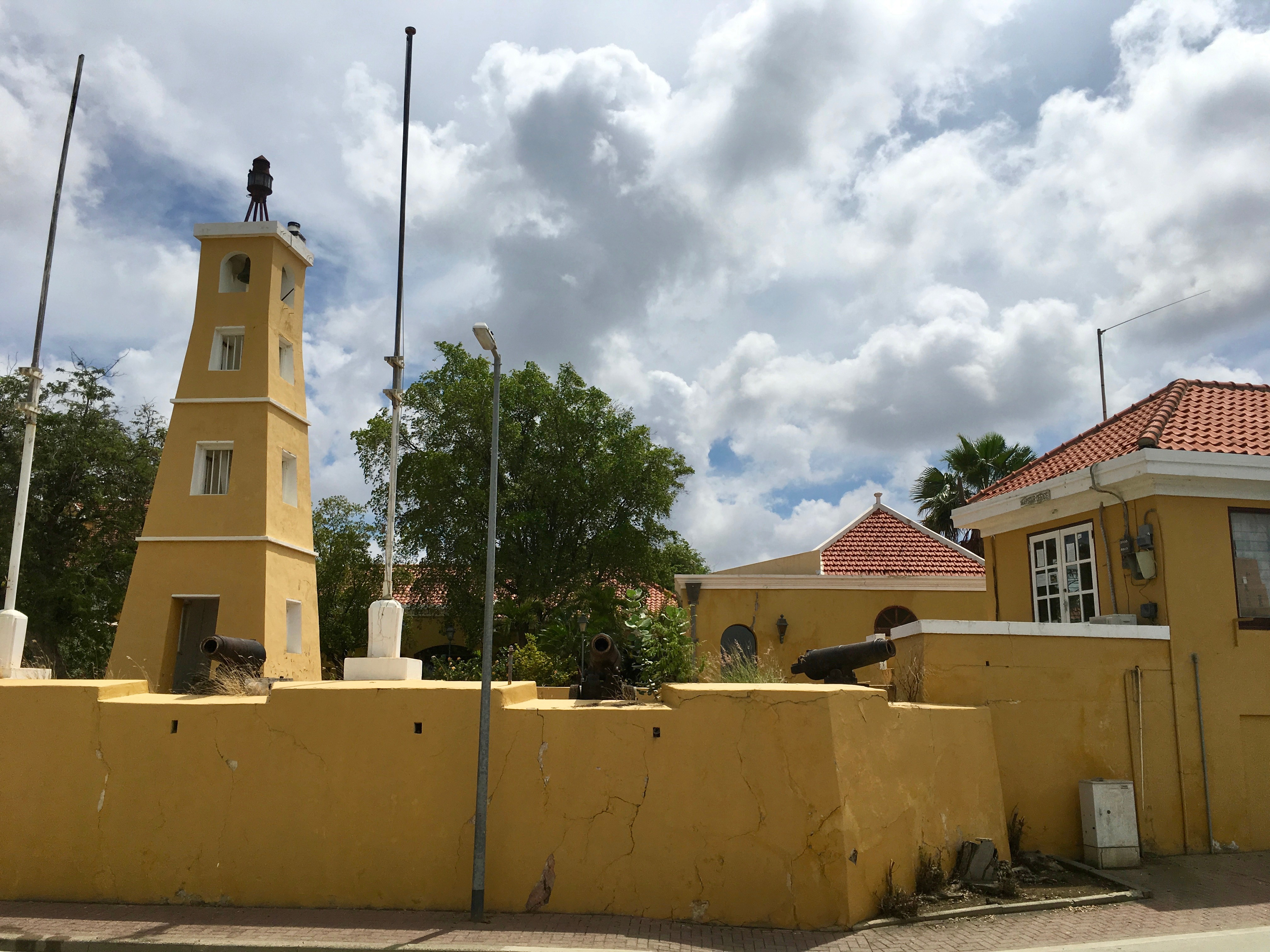

Site information
- Type: Fortification
- Owner: Bonaire
- Open to the public: Yes

Location
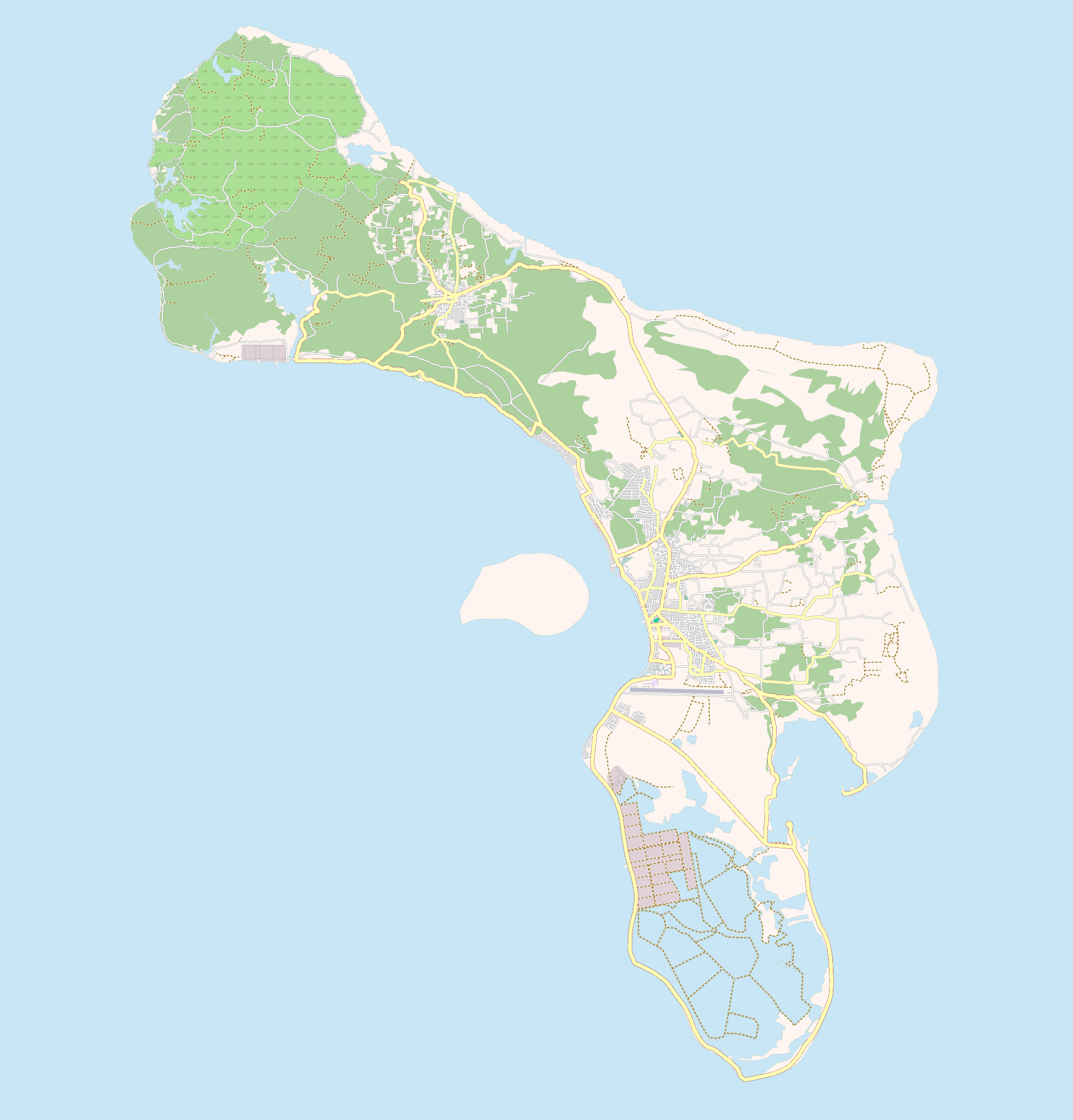
- Location within Bonaire Fort Orange (the Caribbean)
- Coordinates: 12.14883°N 68.27674°W
- Area: 0.308 hectares (0.76 acres)

Site history
- Built: 1639 (original); 1816 (current building)
- Materials: Stone
- Battles/wars: None

Fort Orange (Dutch: Fort Oranje) is a military fortification in Kralendijk, Bonaire. Originally built in 1639 as a nameless fort by the Dutch West India Company, it is the oldest masonry structure on the island of Bonaire. The fort has never been used for its intended purpose. In 1816, it was rebuilt and named Fort Orange. Its current lighthouse, Kralendijk Lighthouse, was built in 1932. It is one of ten fortresses worldwide named after the Dutch House of Orange.

== History ==
Fort Orange was built in 1639 after the island of Bonaire was conquered by the Netherlands. The fort has four metre high walls with four canons. The original fort was open on the land side. In 1800, Bonaire was ignored by the British. In 1804, Bonaire was taken by the British who had landed their troops out of sight, and captured the fort without a fight from the open land side. The canons which are currently in the fort date from the British period. The fort was originally built with Dutch cannons, however these were never used, and later replaced by the British.

In 1816, Bonaire was returned to the Netherlands. The fort was reconstructed and named Fort Orange. The fort remained the headquarters of the Commander of Bonaire until 1837. The original wooden lighthouse was replaced by a stone lighthouse in 1932.

During the 20th century, the building has been used for multiple purposes: prison, fire department, police department, museum. Until 2011, it was in use by the Public Prosecution Service. Since 2011, it is used by the harbour authority and the waste management company. The ownership of the fort was transferred from the Dutch Government to the Island Territory of Bonaire in 1974.
