= Queen of the Most Holy Rosary Cathedral, Willemstad =

Queen of the Most Holy Rosary Cathedral
- Kathedrale Reina di Santisimo Rosario; Heilige Rozenkrans kathedraal
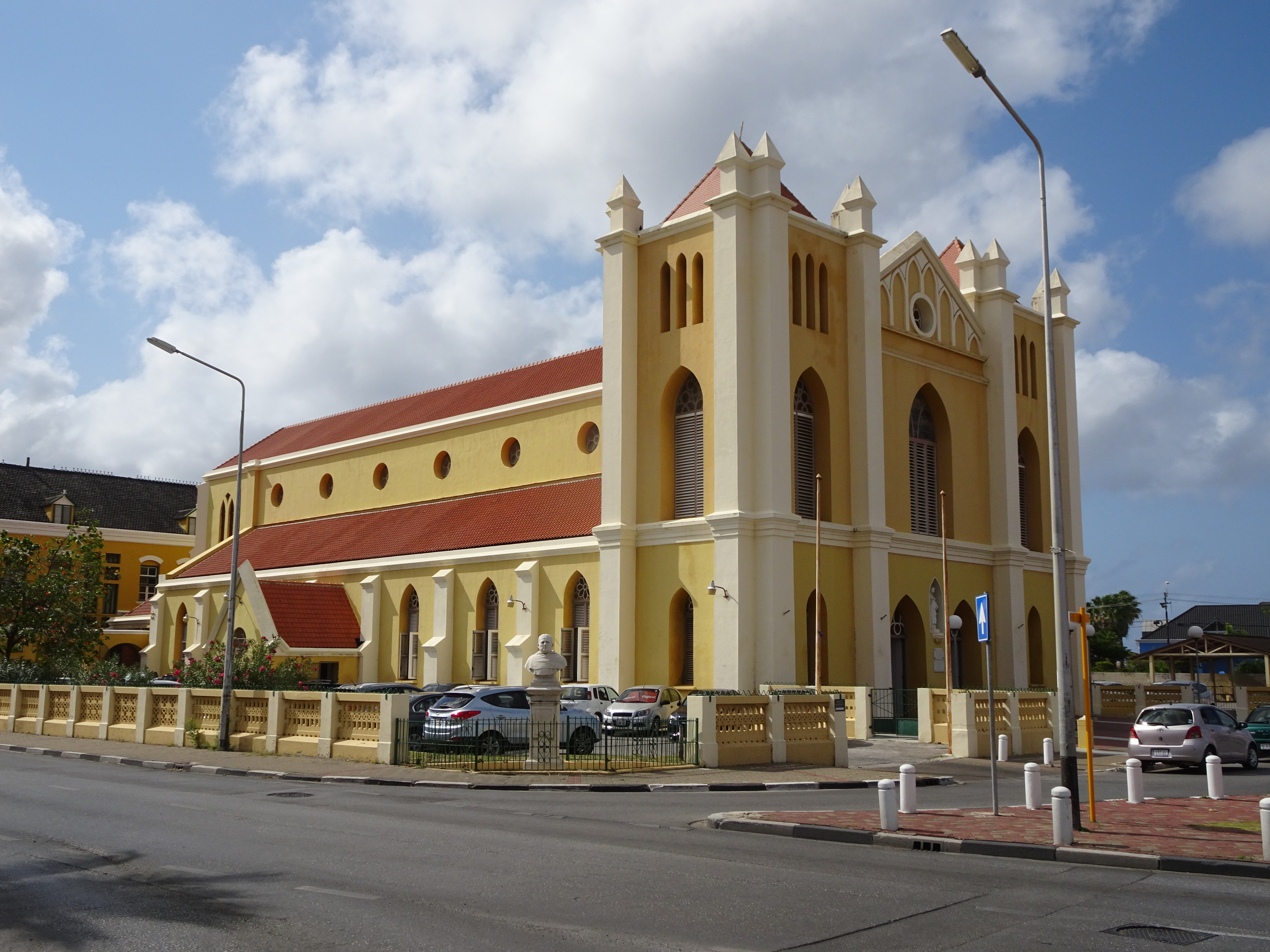
- Queen of the Most Holy Rosary Cathedral
- 12.1031°N 68.9247°W
- Location: Willemstad, Curaçao
- Country: Kingdom of the Netherlands
- Denomination: Catholic Church

The Queen of the Most Holy Rosary Cathedral also known as Pietermaai Cathedral or the Cathedral of the Holy Rosary (Papiamento: Kathedrale Reina di Santisimo Rosario; Dutch: Heilige Rozenkrans kathedraal) is a religious building belonging to the Catholic Church, which serves as the cathedral of the Diocese of Willemstad (Latin: Dioecesis Gulielmopolitana) in Juliana Plein 5, Pietermaai, Willemstad a city on the island of Curacao and has under its jurisdiction all dependent islands of the Netherlands in the Caribbean Sea off the coast of Venezuela.

It was built in 1870, the exterior has a golden ocher and white parts. The interior is nicely designed and painted a bright white. The cathedral is also adorned with many statues as those dedicated to José Gregorio Hernández (whom some faithful attribute miracles in Venezuela and Curacao) and dedicated to the Virgin Mary, the Pieta similar to that in Italy.

The cathedral follows the Roman or Latin rite and since 1997 is World Heritage of Unesco as part of the Historic Area of the city and port of Willemstad.

== See also ==
- Catholic Church in the Dutch Caribbean
