= Catholic Church in the Dutch Caribbean =

Catholic Church in the Caribbean part of the Kingdom of the Netherlands

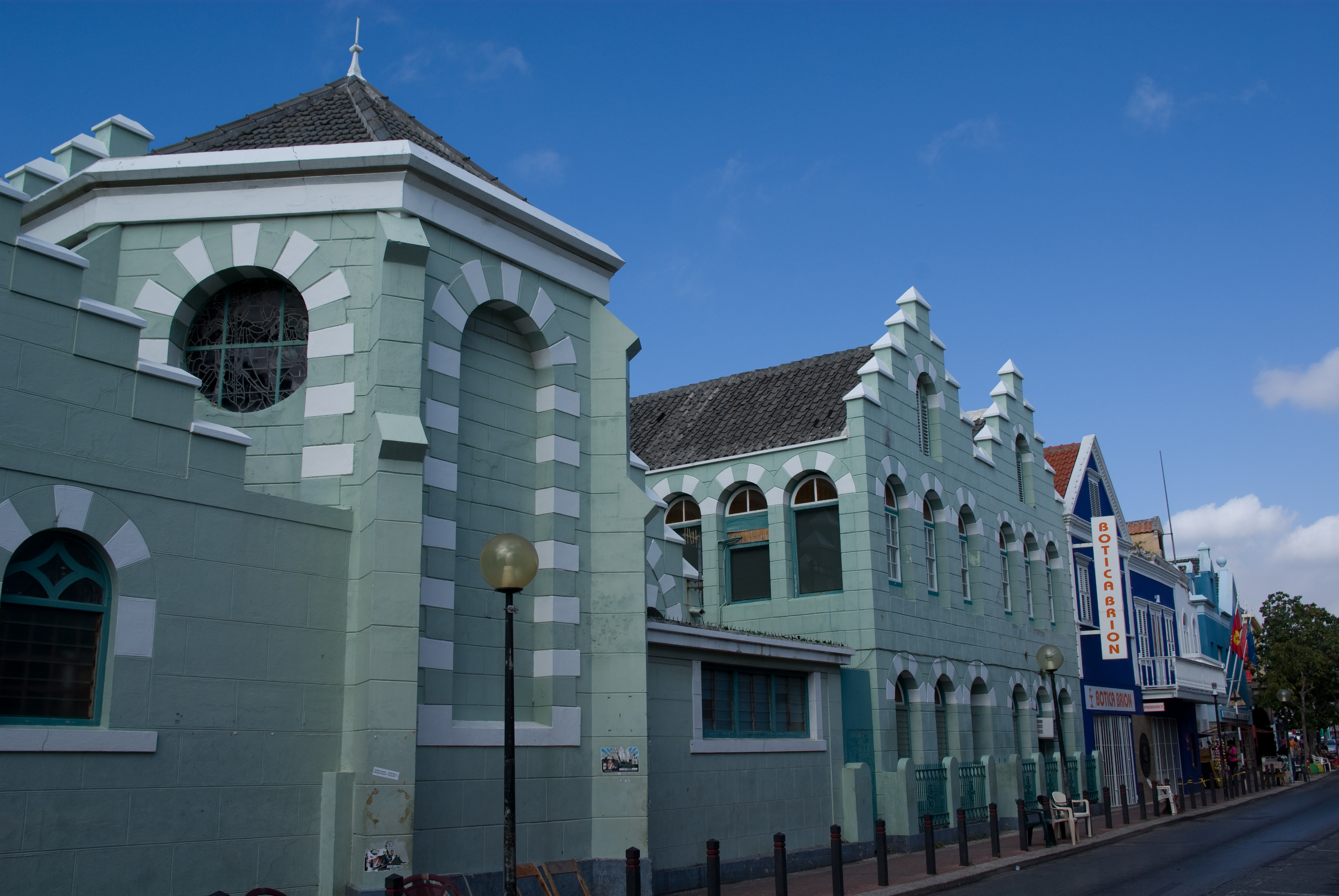
Basilica of St. Anne in Willemstad, Curaçao

The Catholic Church in the Caribbean part of the Kingdom of the Netherlands is part of the worldwide Roman Catholic Church, under the spiritual leadership of the Pope in Rome.

Nearly 80% of the population is Catholic and the whole area is part of the Roman Catholic Diocese of Willemstad. The diocese consists of the territory of the Kingdom of the Netherlands in the Caribbean: the Caribbean Netherlands (the islands of Bonaire, Sint Eustatius and Saba) as well as the countries of Aruba, Curaçao and Sint Maarten. The French part of the island of Saint Martin belongs to the Roman Catholic Diocese of Basse-Terre.

Erected as the apostolic prefecture of Curaçao in 1752, it was elevated to a Vicariate in 1842, and finally the Diocese of Willemstad in April 1958. The Diocese is currently a suffragan of the Archdiocese of Port of Spain in Trinidad. The current bishop is Luigi Antonio Secco, who succeeded in October 2001.

== Aruba ==
The Catholic Church in Aruba is part of the worldwide Catholic Church, under the spiritual leadership of the Pope in Rome. The predominant religion of Aruba is Catholicism, but there is no territorial jurisdiction in Aruba, which is covered by the Diocese of Willemstad in Curaçao.

== Saba ==
In 1701 Dominican priest Jean Baptiste Labat visited Saba and wrote the earliest extant record of the island. In 1836 Msgr. Martinus Niewindt, the Apostolic Prefect of the Roman Catholic Church of the Netherlands Antilles, visited Sint Maarten and Sint Eustatius before arriving on Saba with the purpose of evangelization. He came with Venezuelan priest Manuel Romero who had been a political refugee in Curaçao since the previous year. Between the two men, they spoke French, Dutch, and Spanish. A woman from Guadeloupe who was on the island spoke French and helped the two men communicate with the English-speaking Sabans. The day after their arrival, 21 June 1836, the first Catholic mass was said on Saba. Following the mass, five children were presented for baptism and English catechisms were distributed liberally amongst the population. The island has had a Catholic majority ever since.

Three Catholic churches on the island are: Sacred Heart Church in the town of The Bottom, St. Paul's Conversion Church in Windwardside and the Holy Rosary Church (Heilige Rozenkranskerk) in the village of Hell's Gate.
