= 1969 Curaçao uprising =

Series of riots and protests in Curaçao

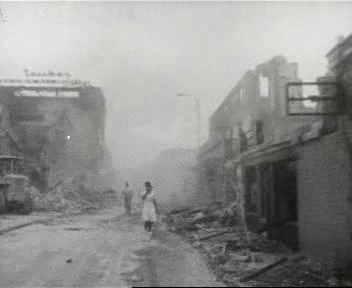
Buildings destroyed in the riots

The 1969 Curaçao uprising (Papiamento: Trinta di Mei, 'Thirtieth of May') was a series of riots on the Caribbean island of Curaçao, then part of the Netherlands Antilles, a semi-independent country in the Kingdom of the Netherlands. The uprising took place mainly on May 30 but continued into the night of May 31 – June 1 1969. The riots arose from a strike by workers in the oil industry. A protest rally during the strike turned violent, leading to widespread looting and destruction of buildings and vehicles in the central business district of Curaçao's capital, Willemstad.

Several causes for the uprising have been cited. The island's economy, after decades of prosperity brought about by the oil industry, particularly a Shell refinery, was in decline and unemployment was rising. Curaçao, a former colony of the Netherlands, became part of the semi-independent Netherlands Antilles under a 1954 charter, which redefined the relationship between the Netherlands and its former colonies. Under this arrangement, Curaçao was still part of the Kingdom of the Netherlands. Anti-colonial activists decried this status as a continuation of colonial rule but others were satisfied the political situation was beneficial to the island. After slavery was abolished in 1863, black Curaçaoans continued to face racism and discrimination. They did not participate fully in the riches resulting from Curaçao's economic prosperity and were disproportionately affected by the rise in unemployment. Black power sentiments in Curaçao were spreading, mirroring developments in the United States and across the Caribbean, of which Curaçaoans were very much aware. The Democratic Party dominated local politics but could not fulfill its promise to maintain prosperity. Radical and socialist ideas became popular in the 1960s. In 1969, a labor dispute arose between a Shell sub-contractor and its employees. This dispute escalated and became increasingly political. A demonstration by workers and labor activists on May 30 became violent, sparking the uprising.

The riots left two people dead and much of central Willemstad destroyed, and hundreds of people were arrested. The protesters achieved most of their immediate demands: higher wages for workers and the Netherlands Antillean government's resignation. It was a pivotal moment in the history of Curaçao and of the vestigial Dutch colonial empire. New parliamentary elections in September gave the uprising's leaders seats in the Parliament of the Netherlands Antilles. A commission investigated the riots; it blamed economic issues, racial tensions, and police and government misconduct. The uprising prompted the Dutch government to undertake new efforts to fully decolonize the remains of its colonial empire. Suriname became independent in 1975 but leaders of the Netherlands Antilles resisted independence, fearing the economic repercussions. The uprising stoked long-standing distrust of Curaçao in nearby Aruba, which seceded from the Netherlands Antilles in 1986. Papiamentu gained social prestige and more widespread use after the uprising. It was followed by a renewal in Curaçaoan literature, much of which dealt with local social issues and sparked discussions about Curaçao's national identity.

== Background and causes ==
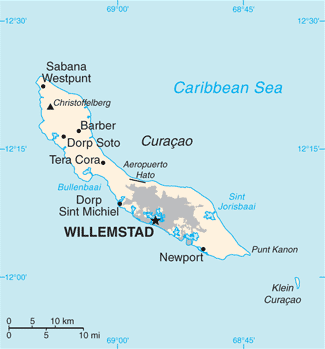
Map of Curaçao

Curaçao is an island in the Caribbean Sea. It is a constituent country of the Kingdom of the Netherlands. In 1969, Curaçao had a population of around 141,000, of whom 65,000 lived in the capital, Willemstad. Until 2010, Curaçao was the most populous island and seat of government of the Netherlands Antilles, a country and former Dutch colony composed of six Caribbean islands, which in 1969 had a combined population of around 225,000.

=== Economic development ===
In the 19th century the island's economy was in poor shape. It had few industries other than the manufacture of dyewood, salt, and straw hats. After the Panama Canal was built and oil was discovered in Venezuela's Maracaibo Basin, Curaçao's economic situation improved. Shell opened an oil refinery on the island in 1918; the refinery was continually expanded until 1930. The plant's production peaked in 1952, when it employed around 11,000 people. This economic boom made Curaçao one of the wealthiest islands in the region and raised living standards there above even those in the Netherlands. This wealth attracted immigrants, particularly from other Caribbean islands, Suriname, Madeira, and the Netherlands. In the 1960s, the number of people working in the oil industry fell and by 1969, Shell's workforce in Curaçao had dropped to around 4,000. This was a result both of automation and of sub-contracting. Employees of sub-contractors typically received lower wages than Shell workers. Unemployment on the island rose from 5,000 in 1961 to 8,000 to 1966, with nonwhite, unskilled workers particularly affected. The government's focus on attracting tourism brought some economic growth but did little to reduce unemployment.

The rise of the oil industry led to the importation of civil servants, mostly from the Netherlands. This led to a segmentation of white, Protestant Curaçaoan society into landskinderen—those whose families had been in Curaçao for generations, and makamba, immigrants from Europe who had closer ties to the Netherlands. Dutch immigrants undermined native white Curaçaoans' political and economic hegemony. As a result, the latter began to emphasize their Antillean identity and use of Papiamentu, the local Creole language. Dutch cultural dominance in Curaçao was a source of conflict; for example, the island's official language was Dutch, which was used in schools, creating difficulties for many students.

=== Colonial and racial relations ===
Another issue that would come to the fore in the uprising was the Netherlands Antilles', and specifically Curaçao's, relationship with the Netherlands. The Netherlands Antilles' status had been changed in 1954 by the Charter for the Kingdom of the Netherlands. Under the Charter, the Netherlands Antilles, like Suriname until 1975, was part of the Kingdom of the Netherlands but not of the Netherlands itself. Foreign policy and national defense were Kingdom matters and presided over by the Council of Ministers of the Kingdom of the Netherlands, which consisted of the full Council of Ministers of the Netherlands with one minister plenipotentiary for each of the countries Netherlands Antilles and Suriname. Other issues were governed at the country or island level. Although this system had its proponents, who pointed to the fact that managing its own foreign relations and national defense would be too costly for a small country like the Netherlands Antilles, many Antilleans saw it as a continuation of the area's subaltern colonial status. There was no strong pro-independence movement in the Antilles as most local identity discourses centered around insular loyalty.

The Dutch colonization of Curaçao began with the importation of African slaves in 1641, and in 1654 the island became the Caribbean's main slave depot. Only in 1863, much later than Britain or France, did the Netherlands abolish slavery in its colonies. A government scholarship program allowed some Afro-Curaçaoans to attain social mobility but the racial hierarchy from the colonial era remained largely intact and blacks continued to face discrimination and were disproportionately affected by poverty. Although 90% of Curaçao's population was of African descent, the spoils of the economic prosperity that began in the 1920s benefited whites and recent immigrants much more than black native Curaçaoans. Like the rest of the Netherlands Antilles, Curaçao was formally democratic but political power was mostly in the hands of white elites.

The situation of black Curaçaoans was similar to that of blacks in the United States and Caribbean countries such as Jamaica, Trinidad and Tobago, and Barbados. The movement leading up to the 1969 uprising used many of the same symbols and rhetoric as Black Power and civil rights movements in those countries. A high Antillean government official would later claim that the island's wide-reaching mass media was one of the uprising's causes. People in Curaçao were aware of events in the US, Europe, and Latin America. Many Antilleans, including students, traveled abroad and many Dutch and American tourists visited Curaçao and many foreigners worked in Curaçao's oil industry. The uprising would parallel anti-colonial, anti-capitalist, and anti-racist movements throughout the world. It was particularly influenced by the Cuban Revolution. Government officials in Curaçao falsely alleged that Cuban communists were directly involved in sparking the uprising, but the revolution did have an indirect influence in that it inspired many of the uprising's participants. Many of the uprising's leaders wore khaki uniforms similar to those worn by Fidel Castro. Black Power movements were emerging throughout the Caribbean and in the US at the time; foreign Black Power figures were not directly involved in the 1969 uprising but they inspired many of its participants.

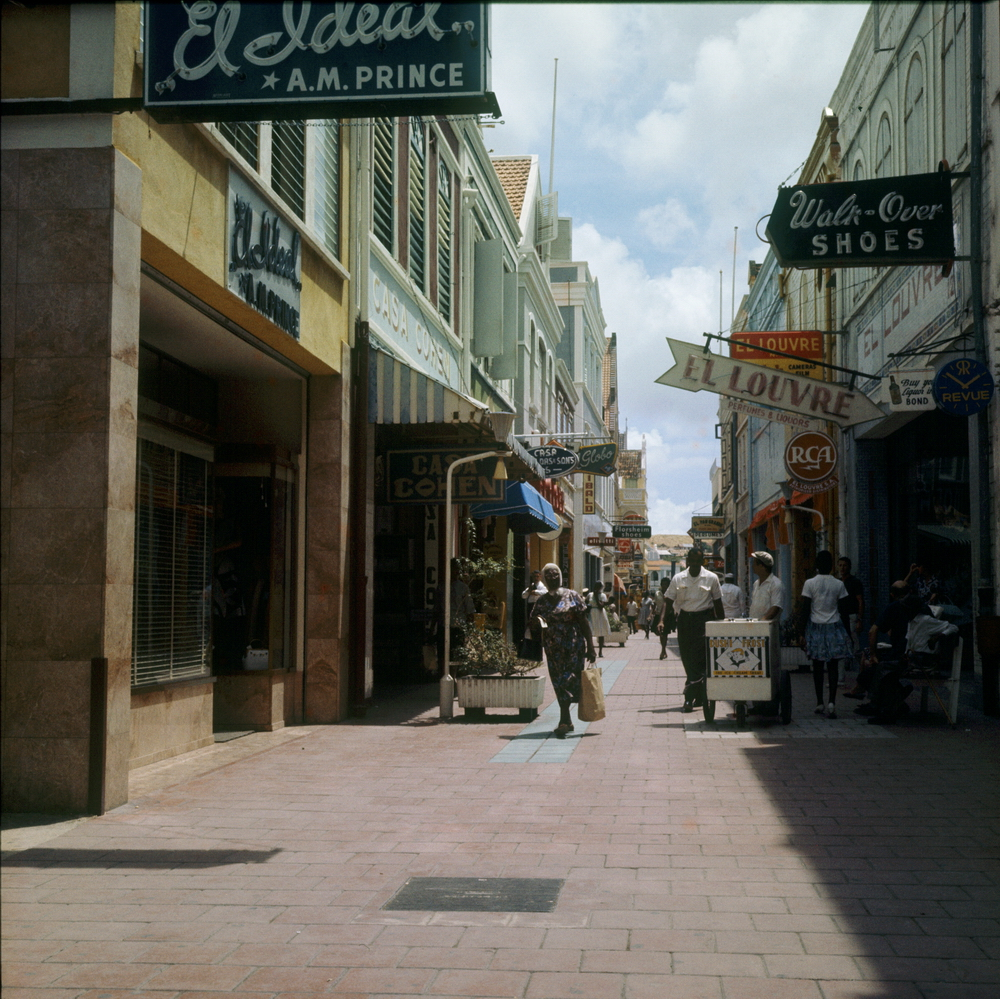
Downtown Willemstad in 1964

=== Local politics ===
Local politics also contributed to the uprising. The center-left Democratic Party (DP) had been in power in the Netherlands Antilles since 1954. The DP was more closely connected to the labor movement than its major rival, the National People's Party (NVP). This relationship was strained by the DP's inability to satisfy expectations it would improve workers' conditions. The DP was mainly associated with the white segments of the working class and blacks criticized it for primarily advancing white interests. The 1960s also saw the rise of radicalism in Curaçao. Many students went to the Netherlands to study and some returned with radical left-wing ideas and founded the Union Reformista Antillano (URA) in 1965. The URA established itself as a socialist alternative to the established parties, although it was more reformist than revolutionary in outlook. Beyond parliamentary politics, Vitó, a weekly magazine at the center of a movement aiming to end the economic and political exploitation of the masses thought to be a result of neo-colonialism, published analyses of local economic, political, and social conditions. Vitó started being published in Papiamentu rather than in Dutch in 1967, and gained a mass following. It had close ties with radical elements in the labor movement. Papa Godett, a leader in the dock workers' union, worked with Stanley Brown, the editor of Vitó.

== Labor dispute ==
Although the progressive priest Amado Römer had warned that "great changes still need to come through a peaceful revolution, because, if this doesn't happen peacefully, the day is not far off when the oppressed [...] will rise up", Curaçao was thought an unlikely site for political turmoil despite low wages, high unemployment, and economic disparities between blacks and whites. The relative tranquility was attributed by the island's government to the strength of family ties. In a 1965 pitch to investors, the government ascribed the absence of a communist party and labor unions' restraint to the fact that "Antillean families are bound together by unusually strong ties and therefore extremist elements have little chance to interfere in labor relations". Labor relations, including those between Shell and the refinery's workers, had indeed generally been peaceful. After two minor strikes in the 1920s and another in 1936, a contract committee for Shell workers was established. In 1942, workers of Dutch nationality gained the right to elect representatives to this committee. In 1955, the Puerto Rican section of the American labor federation Congress of Industrial Organizations (CIO) aided workers in launching the Petroleum Workers' Federation of Curaçao (PWFC). In 1957, the Federation reached a collective bargaining agreement with Shell for workers at the refinery.

The PWFC was part of the General Conference of Trade Unions (AVVC), the island's largest labor confederation. The AVVC generally took a moderate stance in labor negotiations and was often criticized for this, and for its close relationship to the Democratic Party, by the more radical parts of the Curaçaoan labor movement. Close relations between unions and political leaders were widespread in Curaçao, though few unions were explicitly allied with a particular party and the labor movement was starting to gain independence. The Curaçao Federation of Workers (CFW), another union in the AVVC, represented construction workers employed by the Werkspoor Caribbean Company, a Shell sub-contractor. The CWF was to play an important role in the events that led to the uprising. Among the unions criticizing the AVVC was the General Dock Workers Union (AHU), which was led by Papa Godett and Amador Nita and was guided by a revolutionary ideology seeking to overthrow the remnants of Dutch colonialism, especially discrimination against blacks. Godett was closely allied with Stanley Brown, the editor of Vitó. The labor movement before the 1969 uprising was very fragmented and personal animosity between labor leaders further exacerbated this situation.

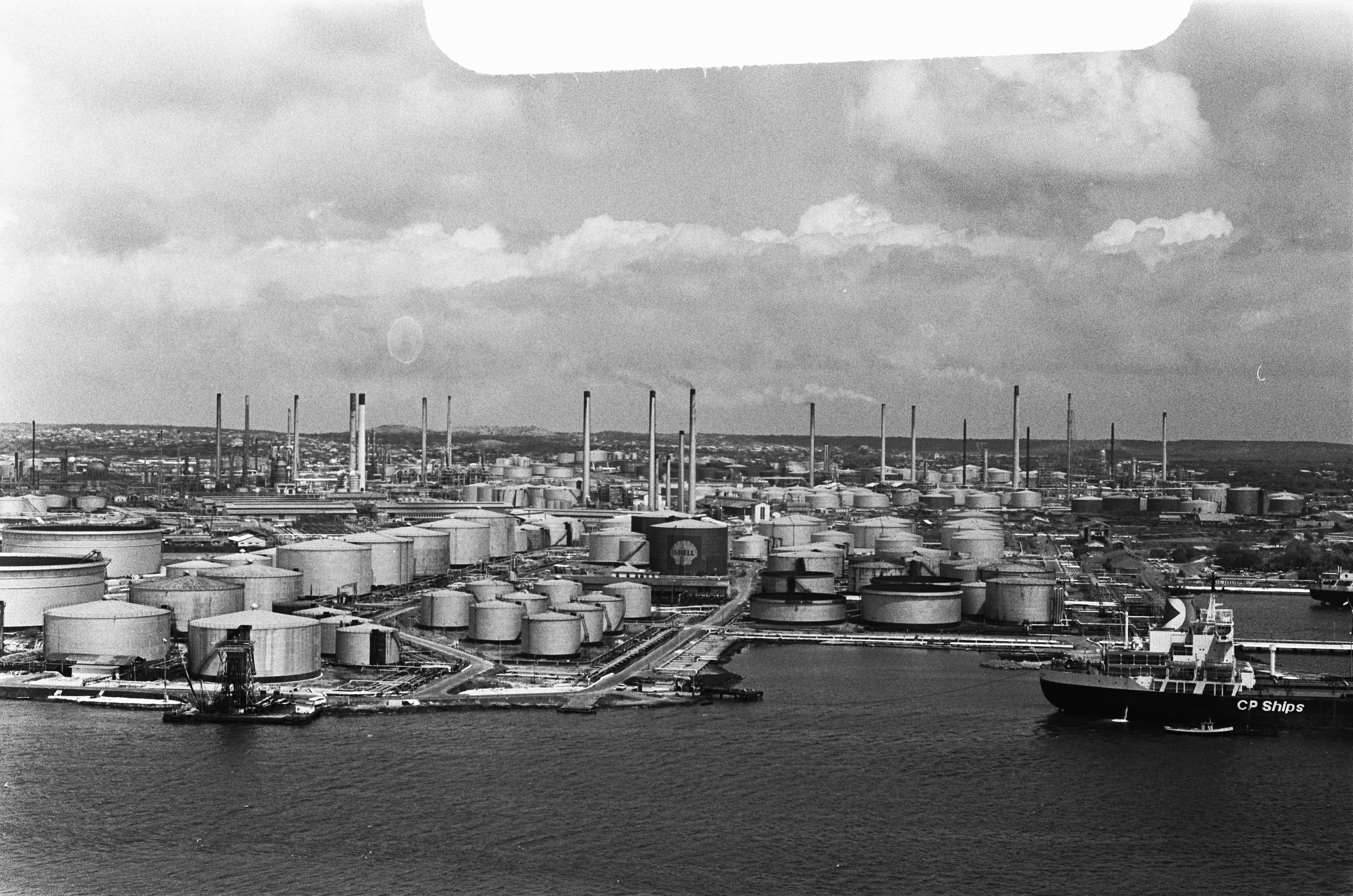
Shell refinery in Curaçao in 1975

In May 1969, there was a labor dispute between the CFW and Werkspoor. It revolved around two central issues. For one, Antillean Werkspoor employees received lower wages than workers from the Netherlands or other Caribbean islands as the latter were compensated for working away from home. Secondly, Werkspoor employees performed the same work as Shell employees but received lower wages. Werkspoor's response pointed to the fact that it could not afford to pay higher wages under its contract with Shell. Vitó was heavily involved in the dispute, helping to keep the conflict in the public consciousness. Though the dispute between CFW and Werkspoor received the most attention, that month significant labor unrest occurred throughout the Netherlands Antilles.

On May 6, around 400 Werkspoor employees went on strike. The Antillean Werkspoor workers received support and solidarity from non-Antilleans at Werkspoor and from other Curaçaoan unions. On May 8, this strike ended with an agreement to negotiate a new contract with government mediation. These negotiations failed, leading to a second strike that began on May 27. The dispute became increasingly political as labor leaders felt the government should intervene on their behalf. The Democratic Party was in a dilemma, as it did not wish to lose support from the labor movement and was wary of drawn-out and disruptive labor disputes, but also felt that giving in to excessive demands by labor would undermine its strategy to attract investments in industry. As the conflict progressed, radical leaders including Amador Nita and Papa Godett gained influence. On May 29, as a moderate labor figure was about to announce a compromise and postpone a strike, Nita took that man's notes and read a declaration of his own. He demanded the government resign and threatened a general strike. The same day, between thirty and forty workers marched to Fort Amsterdam, the Antillean government's seat, contending that the government, which had refused to intervene in the dispute, was contributing to the repression of wages. While the strike was led by the CFW, the PWFC under pressure from its members, showed solidarity with the strikers and decided to call for a strike to support the Werkspoor workers.

== Uprising ==
Dutch newsreel covering the uprising on May 30, 1969

On the morning of May 30, more unions announced strikes in support of the CFW's dispute with Werkspoor. Between three and four thousand workers gathered at a strike post. While the CFW emphasized that this was merely an economic dispute, Papa Godett, the dock workers' leader and Vitó activist, advocated a political struggle in his speech to the strikers. He criticized the government's handling of the labor dispute and demanded its removal. He called for another march to Fort Amsterdam, which was seven miles (11 km) away in Punda in downtown Willemstad. "If we don't succeed without force, then we have to use force. [...] The people is the government. The present government is no good and we will replace it", he proclaimed. The march was five thousand people strong when it started moving towards the city center. As it progressed through the city, people who were not associated with the strike joined, most of them young, black, and male, some oil workers, some unemployed. There were no protest marshals and leaders had little control over the crowd's actions. They had not anticipated any escalation.

Among the slogans the crowd chanted were "Pan y rekonosimiento" ('Bread and recognition'), "Ta kos di kapitalista, kibra nan numa" ('These are possessions of capitalists, just destroy them'), and "Tira piedra. Mata e kachónan di Gobièrnu. Nos mester bai Punda, Fòrti. Mata e makambanan" ('Throw stones. Death to the government dogs. Let's go to Punda, to the fort. Death to the makamba'"). The march became increasingly violent. A pick-up truck with a white driver was set on fire and two stores were looted. Then, large commercial buildings including a Coca-Cola bottling plant and a Texas Instruments factory were attacked, and marchers entered the buildings to halt production. Texas Instruments had a poor reputation because it had prevented unionization among its employees. Housing and public buildings were generally spared. Once it became aware, the police moved to stop the rioting and called for assistance from the local volunteer militia and from Dutch troops stationed in Curaçao. The police, with only sixty officers at the scene, were unable to halt the march and ended up enveloped by the demonstration, with car drivers attempting to hit them.

The police moved to secure a hill on the march route and were pelted with rocks. Papa Godett was shot in the back by the police; he later said the police had orders to kill him, while law enforcement said officers acted only to save their own lives. Godett was taken to the hospital by members of the demonstration and parts of the march broke away to follow them. One of two fire trucks dispatched to assist the police was set on fire and pushed towards the police lines. The striker steering it was shot and killed. The main part of the march moved to Punda, Willemstad's central business district where it separated into smaller groups. The protesters chanted "Awe yu di Korsou a bira koño" ("Now the people of Curaçao are really fed up") and "Nos lo siña nan respeta nos" ("We will teach them to respect us"). Some protesters crossed a bridge to the other side of Sint Anna Bay, an area known as Otrabanda. The first building burned in Otrabanda was a shop Vitó had criticized for having particularly poor working conditions. From this store, flames spread to other buildings. Stores on both sides of the bay were looted and subsequently set on fire, as were an old theater and the bishop's palace. Women took looted goods home in shopping carts. There was an attempt to damage the bridge that crossed the bay.

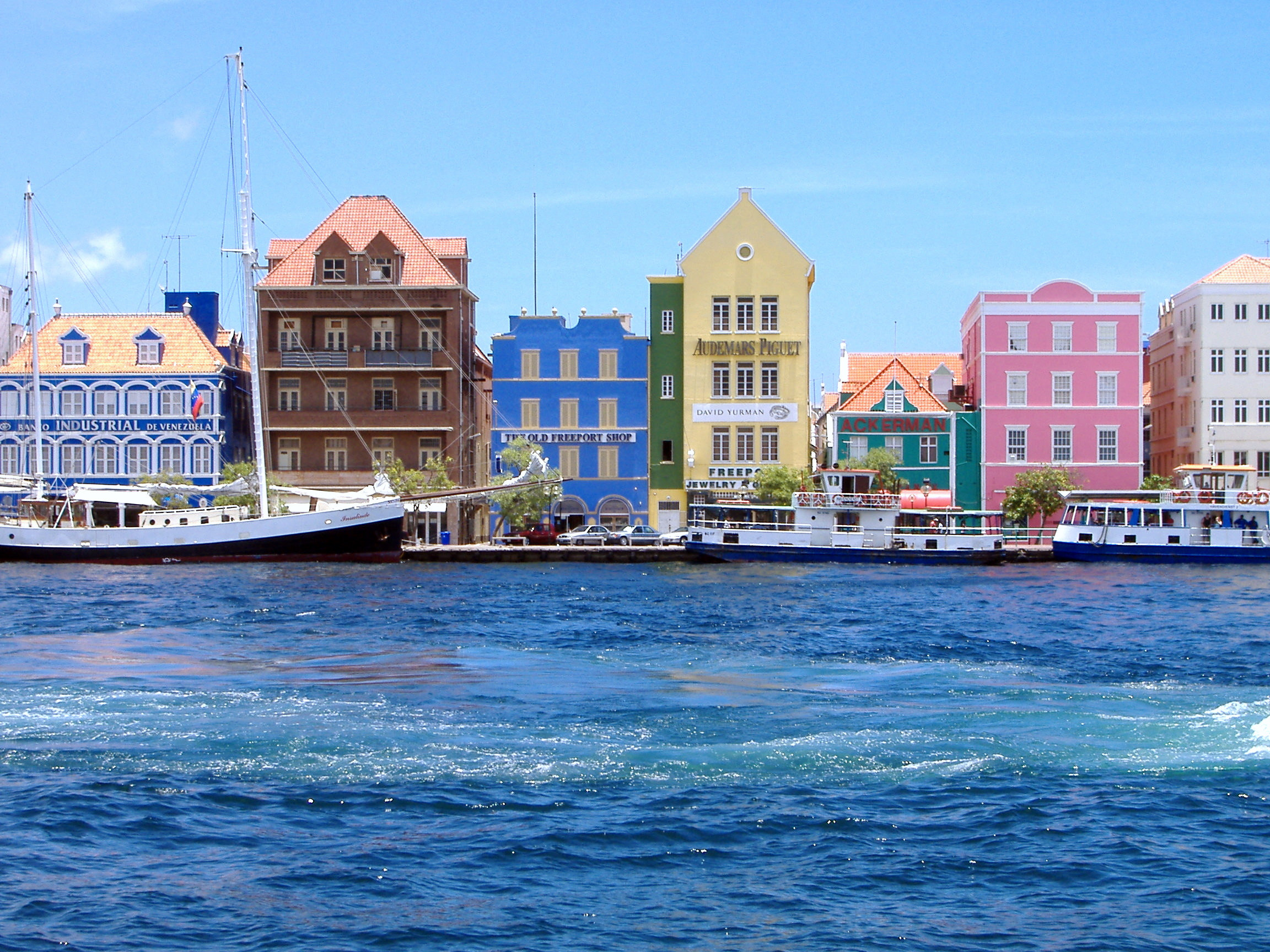
Punda, the central business district, seen from the harbor, in 2005

The government imposed a curfew and a ban on liquor sales. The Prime Minister of the Netherlands Antilles Ciro Domenico Kroon went into hiding during the riots while Governor Cola Debrot and the Deputy Governor Wem Lampe were also absent. Lower-ranking government officials were left to request the assistance of elements of the Netherlands Marine Corps stationed in Curaçao. While constitutionally required to honor this request under the Charter, the Kingdom's Council of Ministers did not officially approve it until later. The soldiers, however, immediately joined police, local volunteers and firemen as they fought to stop the rioting, put out fires in looted buildings, and guarded banks and other key buildings while thick plumes of smoke emanated from the city center. Many of the buildings in this part of Willemstad were old and therefore vulnerable to fire while the compact nature of the central business district further hampered firefighting efforts. In the afternoon, clergymen made a statement via radio urging the looters to stop. Meanwhile, union leaders announced that they had reached a compromise with Werkspoor. Shell workers would receive equal wages regardless of whether they were employed by contractors and regardless of their national origin.

Although the protesters achieved their economic aims, rioting continued throughout the night and slowly abated on May 31. The uprising's focus shifted from economic demands to political goals. Union leaders, both radical and moderate, demanded the government's resignation and threatened a general strike. Workers broke into a radio station, forcing it to broadcast this demand; they argued that failed economic and social policies had led to the grievances and the uprising. On May 31, Curaçaoan labor leaders met with union representatives from Aruba, which was then also part of the Netherlands Antilles. The Aruban delegates agreed with the demand for the government's resignation, announcing Aruban workers would also go on a general strike if it was ignored. By the night of May 31 to June 1, the violence had ceased. Another 300 Dutch marines arrived from the Netherlands on June 1 to maintain order.

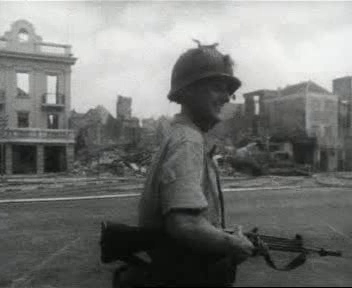
A Dutch soldier patrolling Willemstad, with rubble in the background

The uprising cost two lives—the dead were identified as A. Gutierrez and A. Doran—and 22 police officers and 57 others were injured. The riots led to 322 arrests, including the leaders Papa Godett and Amador Nita of the dock workers' union, and Stanley Brown, the editor of Vitó. Godett was kept under police surveillance while he recovered from his bullet wound, in the hospital. During the disturbances, 43 businesses and 10 other buildings were burned and 190 buildings were damaged or looted. Thirty vehicles were destroyed by fire. The damage caused by the uprising was valued at around US$40 million. The looting was highly selective, mainly targeting businesses owned by whites while avoiding tourists. In some cases rioters led tourists out of the disturbance to their hotels to protect them. Nevertheless, the riots drove away most tourists and damaged the island's reputation as a tourist destination. On May 31, Amigoe di Curaçao, a local newspaper, declared that with the uprising, "the leaden mask of a carefree, untroubled life in the Caribbean Sea was ripped from part of Curaçao, perhaps forever". The riots evoked a wide range of emotions among the island's population; "Everyone was crying" when it ended, said one observer. There was pride that Curaçaoans had finally stood up for themselves. Some were ashamed it had come to a riot or of having taken part. Others were angry at the rioters, the police, or at the social wrongs that had given rise to the riots.

The uprising achieved both its economic and political demands. On June 2 all parties in the Parliament of the Netherlands Antilles, pressured by the Chamber of Commerce that feared further strikes and violence, agreed to dissolve that body. On June 5, the Prime Minister Ciro Domenico Kroon submitted his resignation to the Governor. Parliamentary elections were set for September 5. On June 26, an interim government headed by new Prime Minister Gerald Sprockel took charge of the Netherlands Antilles.

== Aftermath ==
Trinta di Mei became a pivotal moment in the history of Curaçao, contributing to the end of white political dominance. While Peter Verton as well as William Averette Anderson and Russell Rowe Dynes characterize the events as a revolt, historian Gert Oostindie considers this term too broad. All of these writers agree revolution was never a possibility. Anderson, Dynes, and Verton regard the uprising as part of a broader movement, the May Movement or May 30 Movement, which began with the strikes in early 1969 and continued in electoral politics and with another wave of strikes in December 1969.

=== Political effects ===
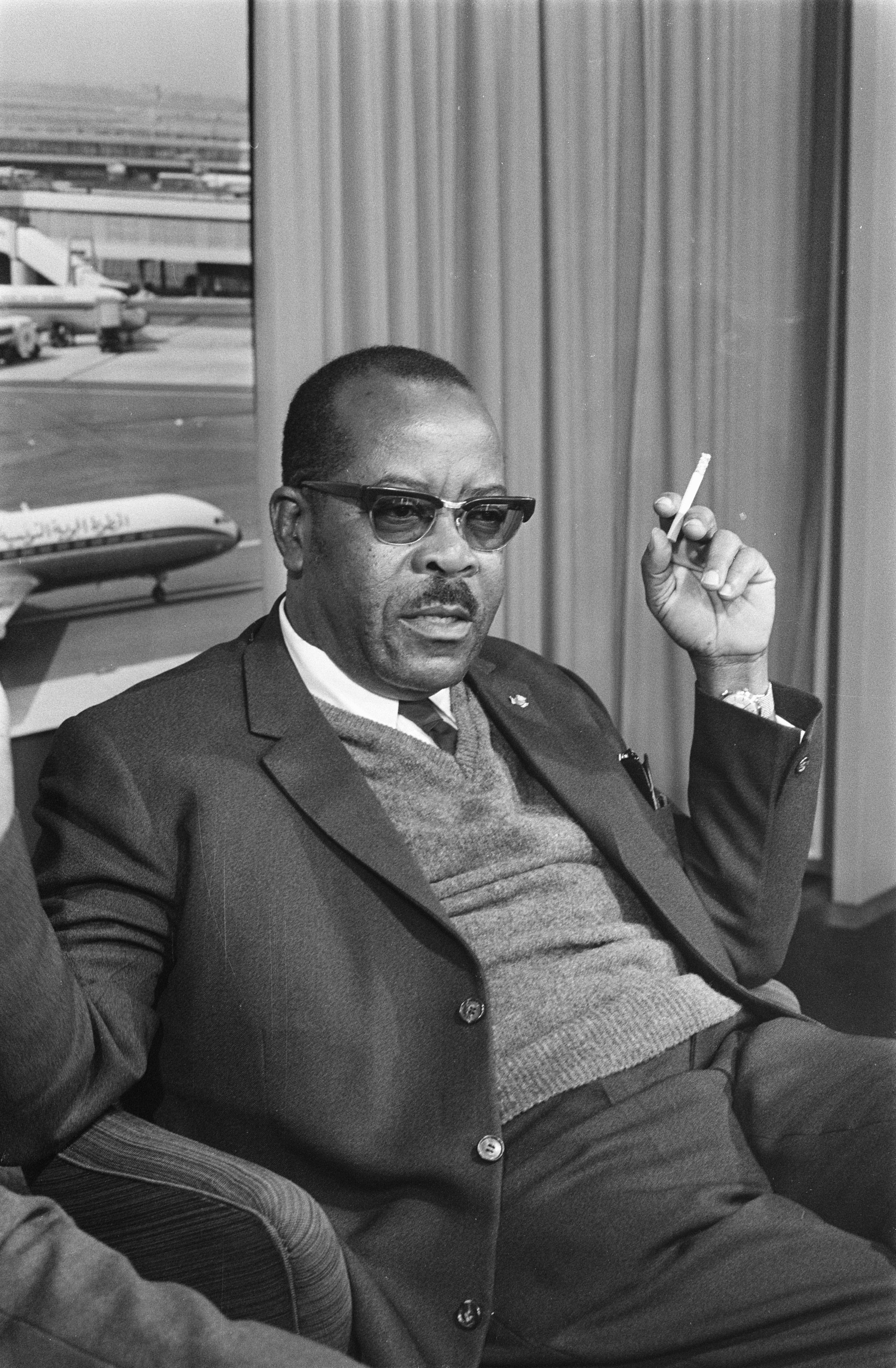
Ernesto Petronia, the Netherlands Antilles' first black Prime Minister, elected shortly after the 1969 uprising

The uprising's leaders, Godett, Nita, and Brown, formed a new political party, the May 30 Labor and Liberation Front (Frente Obrero Liberashon 30 Di Mei, FOL), in June 1969. Brown was still in prison when the party was founded. The FOL fielded candidates in the September election against the Democratic Party, the National People's Party, and the URA with Godett as its top candidate. The FOL campaigned on the populist, anti-colonial, and anti-Dutch messages voiced during the uprising, espousing black pride and a positive Antillean identity. One of its campaign posters depicted Kroon, the former Prime Minister and the Democratic Party's main candidate, shooting protesters. The FOL received 22% of the vote in Curaçao and won three of the island's twelve seats in Parliament, which had a total of twenty-two seats. The three FOL leaders took those seats. In December, Ernesto Petronia of the Democratic Party became the Netherlands Antilles' first black Prime Minister and FOL formed part of the coalition government. In 1970, the Dutch government appointed Ben Leito as the first black Governor of the Netherlands Antilles.

In October of the same year, a commission similar to the Kerner Commission in the United States was established to investigate the uprising. Five of its members were Antillean and three were Dutch. It released its report in May 1970 after gathering data, conducting interviews, and holding hearings. It deemed the uprising unexpected, finding no evidence it had been pre-planned. The report concluded that the primary causes of the riots were racial tensions and disappointed economic expectations. The report was critical of the conduct of the police and on its recommendation a Lieutenant Governor with police experience was appointed. Patronage appointments were reduced in keeping with the commission's recommendations but most of its suggestions, and its criticism of government and police conduct, were ignored. The commission also pointed to a contradiction between the demands for national independence and economic prosperity: according to the report, independence would almost certainly lead to economic decline.

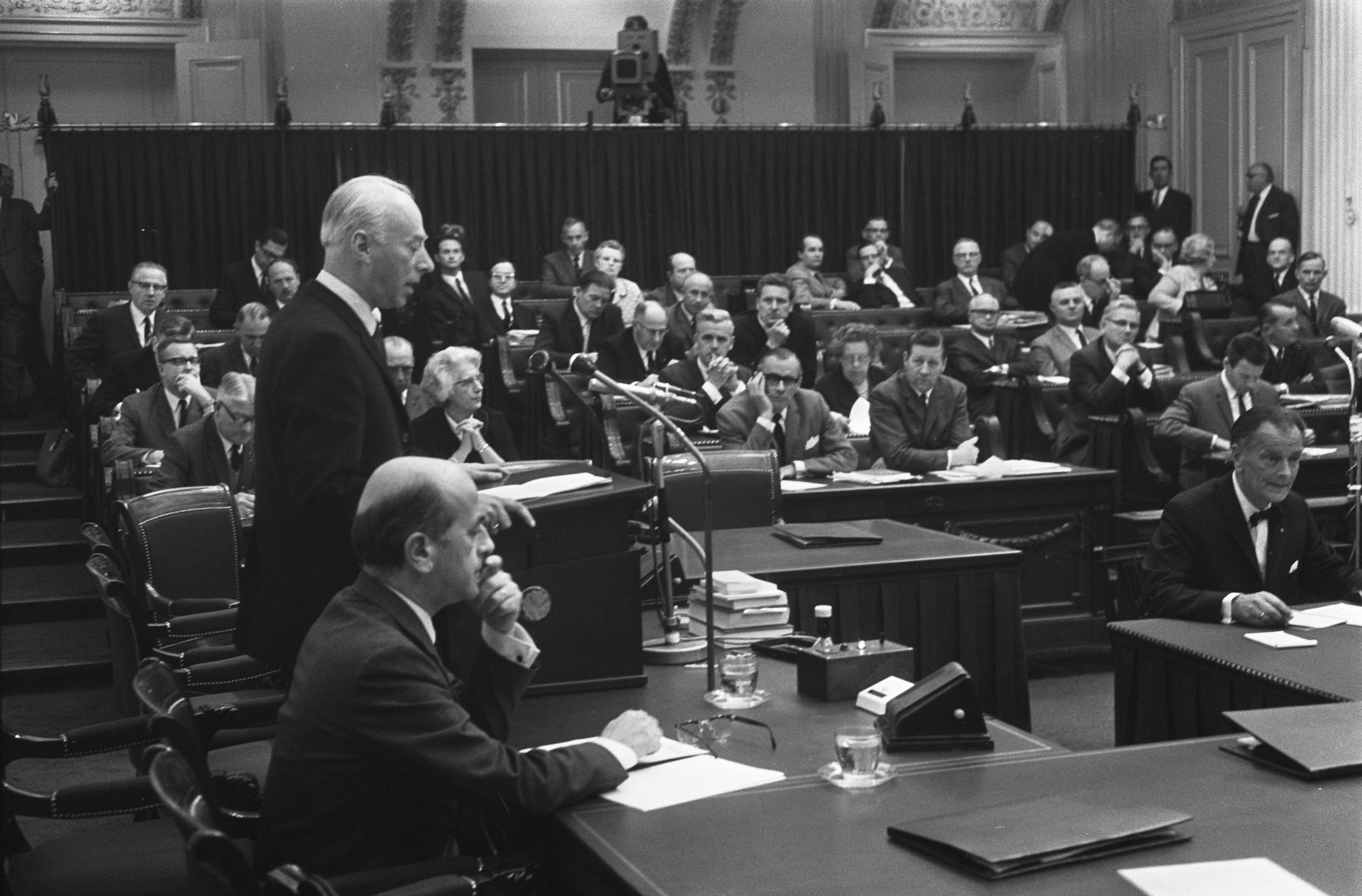
The Dutch Parliament on June 3, 1969 discussing the riots in Curaçao

On June 1, 1969, in The Hague, the seat of the Dutch government, between 300 and 500 people, including some Antillean students, marched in support of the uprising in Curaçao and clashed with police. The protesters denounced the deployment of Dutch troops and called for Antillean independence. The 1969 uprising became a watershed moment in the decolonization of Dutch possessions in the Americas. The Dutch parliament discussed the events in Curaçao on June 3. The parties in government and the opposition agreed that no other response to the riots was possible under the Kingdom's charter. The Dutch press was more critical. Images of Dutch soldiers patrolling the streets of Willemstad with machine guns were shown around the world. Much of the international press viewed Dutch involvement as a neo-colonial intervention. The Indonesian War of Independence, in which the former Dutch East Indies broke away from the Netherlands in the 1940s and in which some 150,000 Indonesians and 5,000 Dutch died, was still on the Dutch public's minds. In January 1970, consultations about independence between Dutch Minister for Surinamese and Antillean Affairs Joop Bakker, Surinamese Prime Minister Jules Sedney, and Petronia began. The Dutch government, fearing after Trinta di Mei it could be forced into a military intervention, wanted to release the Antilles and Suriname into independence; according to Bakker, "It would be preferably today rather than tomorrow that the Netherlands would get rid of the Antilles and Suriname". Yet, the Netherlands insisted it did not wish to force independence on the two countries. Deliberations over the next years revealed that independence would be a difficult task, as the Antilleans and the Surinamese were concerned about losing Dutch nationality and Dutch development aid. In 1973, both countries rejected a Dutch proposal for a path to independence. In Suriname's case, this impasse was overcome suddenly in 1974 when new administrations took power both in the Netherlands and in Suriname, and rapid negotiations resulted in Surinamese independence on November 25 1975.

The Netherlands Antilles resisted any swift move to independence. It insisted that national sovereignty would only be an option once it had "attained a reasonable level of economic development", as its Prime Minister Juancho Evertsz put it in 1975. Surveys in the 1970s and 1980s showed most of Curaçao's inhabitants agreed with this reluctance to pursue independence: clear majorities favored continuing the Antilles' ties to the Netherlands, but many were in favor of loosening them. By the end of the 1980s, the Netherlands accepted that the Antilles would not be fully decolonized in the near future.

The 1969 uprising in Curaçao encouraged separatist sentiments in Aruba that had existed since the 1930s. Unlike the black-majority Curaçao, most Arubans were of mixed European and Native descent. Though Aruba is just 73 miles (117 km) away from Curaçao, there was a long-standing resentment with significant racial undertones about being ruled from Willemstad. Aruban distrust of Curaçao was further stoked by the uprising's Black Power sentiments. The Aruban island government started working towards separation from the Antilles in 1975 and in 1986, Aruba became a separate country within the Kingdom of the Netherlands. Eventually, in 2010, insular nationalism led to the Netherlands Antilles being completely dissolved and Curaçao becoming a country as well.

Trinta di Mei also reshaped Curaçao's labor movement. A strike wave swept Curaçao in December 1969. Around 3,500 workers participated in eight wildcat strikes that took place within ten days. New, more radical leaders were able to gain influence in the labor movement. As a result of unions' involvement in Trinta di Mei and the December strikes, Curaçaoans had considerably more favorable views of labor leaders than of politicians, as a poll in August 1971 found. In the following years, unions built their power and gained considerable wage increases for their members, forcing even the notoriously anti-union Texas Instruments to negotiate with them. Their membership also grew; the CFW, for instance, went from a pre-May 1969 membership of 1,200 to around 3,500 members in July 1970. The atmosphere after the uprising led to the formation of four new unions. The labor movement's relationship to politics was changed by Trinta di Mei. Unions had been close to political parties and the government for several reasons: They had not existed for very long and were still gaining their footing. Secondly, the government played an important role in economic development and, finally, workers' and unions' position vis-à-vis employers was comparatively weak and they relied on the government's help. The events of 1969 both expressed and hastened the development of a more distant relationship between labor and the state. Government and unions became more distinct entities, although they continued to try to influence one another. Labor was now willing to take a militant position against the state and both parties realized that labor was a force in Curaçaoan society. The government was accused of letting workers down and of using force to suppress their struggle. Unions' relationship with employers changed in a similar way; employers were now compelled to recognize labor as an important force.

=== Social and cultural effects ===
The 1969 uprising put an end to white dominance in politics and administration in Curaçao, and led to the ascendance of a new black political elite. Nearly all of the governors, prime ministers, and ministers in the Netherlands Antilles and Curaçao since 1969 have been black. Although there has been no corresponding change in the island's business elite, upward social mobility increased considerably for well-educated Afro-Curaçaoans and led to improved conditions for the black middle class. The rise of black political elites was controversial from the start. Many FOL supporters were wary of the party entering into government with the Democratic Party, which they had previously denounced as corrupt. The effects of the emergence of new elites for lower-class black Curaçaoans have been limited. Although workers received some new legal protections, their living standards stagnated. In a 1971 survey, three quarters of the respondents said their economic situation had remained the same or worsened. This is mostly the result of difficult conditions that hamper most Caribbean economies, but critics have also blamed mismanagement and corruption by the new political elites.

Among the lasting effects of the uprising was an increase in the prestige of Papiamentu, which became more widely used in official contexts. Papiamentu was spoken by most Curaçaoans but its use was shunned; children who spoke it on school playgrounds were punished. According to Frank Martinus Arion, a Curaçaoan writer, "Trinta di Mei allowed us to recognize the subversive treasure we had in our language". It empowered Papiamentu speakers and sparked discussions about the use of the language. Vitó, the magazine that had played a large part in the build-up to the uprising, had long called for Papiamentu becoming Curaçao's official language once it became independent of the Netherlands. It was recognized as an official language on the island, along with English and Dutch, in 2007. Curaçaoan parliamentary debate is now conducted in Papiamentu and most radio and television broadcasts are in this language. Primary schools teach in Papiamentu but secondary schools still teach in Dutch. Trinta di Mei also accelerated the standardization and formalization of Papiamentu orthography, a process that had begun in the 1940s.

The events of May 30, 1969, and the situation that caused them were reflected in local literature. Papiamentu was considered by many devoid of any artistic quality, but after the uprising literature in the language blossomed. According to Igma M. G. van Putte-de Windt, it was only in the 1970s after the May 30 uprising that an "Antillean dramatic expression in its own right" emerged. Days before the uprising, Stanley Bonofacio premiered Kondená na morto ("Sentenced to death"), a play about the justice system in the Netherlands Antilles. It was banned for a time after the riots. In 1970, Edward A. de Jongh, who watched the riots as he walked the streets, published the novel 30 di Mei 1969: E dia di mas historiko ('May 30, 1969: The Most Historic Day') describing what he perceived as the underlying causes of the uprising: unemployment, the lack of workers' rights, and racial discrimination. In 1971, Pacheco Domacassé wrote the play Tula about a 1795 slave revolt in Curaçao and in 1973 he wrote Konsenshi di un pueblo ('A People's Conscience'), which deals with government corruption and ends in a revolt reminiscent of the May 30 uprising. Curaçaoan poetry after Trinta di Mei, too, was rife with calls for independence, national sovereignty, and social justice.

The 1969 uprising opened up questions concerning Curaçaoan national identity. Prior to Trinta di Mei, one's place in society was determined largely by race; afterward these hierarchies and classifications were put into question. This led to debates about whether Afro-Curaçaoans were the only true Curaçaoans and to what extent Sephardic Jews and the Dutch, who had been present throughout Curaçao's colonial period, and more recent immigrants belonged. In the 1970s, there were formal attempts at nation-building; an island anthem was introduced in 1979, an island Hymn and Flag Day were instituted in 1984, and resources were devoted to promoting the island's culture. Papiamentu became central to Curaçaoan identity. More recently, civic values, rights of participation, and a common political knowledge are said to have become important issues in determining national identity.

== Bibliography ==
- Allen, Rose Mary (2010). "The Complexity of National Identity Construction in Curaçao, Dutch Caribbean" (PDF). European Review of Latin American and Caribbean Studies (89): 117–125. doi:10.18352/erlacs.9461. ISSN 0924-0608.
- Anderson, William Averette; Dynes, Russell Rowe (1975). Social Movements, Violence, and Change: The May Movement in Curaçao. Columbus: Ohio State University Press. ISBN 0-8142-0240-3.
- Blakely, Allison (1993). Blacks in the Dutch World: The Evolution of Racial Imagery in a Modern Society. Bloomington, IN: Indiana University Press. ISBN 0-2532-1433-5.
- Clemencia, Joceline (1994). "Katibu ta galiña: From Hidden to Open Protest in Curaçao". In Arnold, A. James (ed.). A History of Literature in the Caribbean: English- and Dutch-speaking countries. Amsterdam/Philadelphia: John Benjamins Publishing Company. pp. 433–477. ISBN 1-58811-041-9.
- Eckkrammer, Eva (1999). "The Standardisation of Papiamentu: New Trends, Problems and Perspectives". Bulletin Suisse de Linguistique Appliquée. 69 (1): 59–74. ISSN 1023-2044.
- Eckkrammer, Eva (2007). "Papiamentu, Cultural Resistance, and Socio-Cultural Challenges: The ABC Islands in a Nutshell". Journal of Caribbean Literatures. 5 (1): 73–93. ISSN 2167-9460. JSTOR 40986319.
- Oostindie, Gert; Verton, Peter (1998). "Ki sorto di Reino/What kind of Kingdom?: Antillean and Aruban views and expectations of the Kingdom of the Netherlands". New West Indian Guide / Nieuwe West-Indische Gids. 72 (1–2): 117–125. doi:10.1163/13822373-90002599. ISSN 2213-4360.
- Oostindie, Gert; Klinkers, Inge (2003). Decolonising the Caribbean: Dutch Policies in a Comparative Perspective. Amsterdam: Amsterdam University Press. ISBN 90-5356-654-6.
- Oostindie, Gert (2015). "Black Power, Popular Revolt, and Decolonization in the Dutch Caribbean". In Quinn, Kate (ed.). Black Power in the Caribbean. Gainesville, FL: University Press of Florida. pp. 239–260. doi:10.5744/florida/9780813049090.003.0012. ISBN 978-0-8130-4909-0.
- Römer, R.A. (1981). "Labour Unions and Labour Conflict in Curaçao". New West Indian Guide / Nieuwe West-Indische Gids. 55 (1): 138–153. doi:10.1163/22134360-90002122. ISSN 2213-4360.
- Sharpe, Michael Orlando (2009). "Curaçao, 1969 Uprising". In Ness, Immanuel (ed.). The International Encyclopedia of Revolution and Protest: 1500 to the Present. Malden, MA: Wiley-Blackwell. pp. 942–943. doi:10.1002/9781405198073.wbierp0429. ISBN 978-1-4051-8464-9.
- Sharpe, Michael Orlando (2015). "Race, Color, and Nationalism in Aruban and Curaçaoan Political Identities". In Essed, Philomena; Hoving, Isabel (eds.). Dutch Racism. Amsterdam/New York: Brill. pp. 117–131. doi:10.1163/9789401210096_007. ISBN 978-9-0420-3758-8.
- van Putte-de Windt, Igma M. G. (1994). "Forms of Dramatic Expression in the Leeward Islands". In Arnold, A. James (ed.). A History of Literature in the Caribbean: English- and Dutch-speaking countries. Comparative History of Literatures in European Languages. Amsterdam/Philadelphia: John Benjamins Publishing Company. pp. 597–614. doi:10.1075/chlel.xv.56put. ISBN 1-58811-041-9.
- Verton, Peter (1976). "Emancipation and Decolonization: The May Revolt and Its Aftermath in Curaçao". Revista/Review Interamericana. 6 (1): 88–101.
- Verton, Peter (1977). "Modernization in Twentieth Century Curaçao: New Elites and Their Followers". Revista/Review Interamericana. 7 (2): 248–259.
