= Alejandro Felipe Paula =

Dutch academic and politician

Prime Minister of the Netherlands Antilles
- In office 28 December 1993 – 31 March 1994
- Monarch: Beatrix
- Governor: Jaime Saleh
- Preceded by: Suzanne Camelia-Römer
- Succeeded by: Miguel Pourier

Personal details
- Born: 2 May 1937 Curaçao
- Died: 13 August 2018 (aged 81)

Alejandro Felipe Paula also known as Jandi Paula (2 May 1937 – 13 August 2018) was a Curaçaoan academic, historian and politician. He served as Prime Minister of the Netherlands Antilles from 28 December 1993 to 31 March 1994. Paula was director of the National Archive of the Netherlands Antilles between 1969 and 1989. He also was a professor and rector at the University of the Netherlands Antilles in the 1990s.

== Career ==
Paula was born on Curaçao on 2 May 1937. He was partially schooled in Trinidad and Tobago. Paula later studied in the Netherlands, the Dominican Republic and Italy, obtaining his doctorate degree “cum laude” at the Saint Thomas of Aquinas University in Rome, defending a thesis titled from Objective to Subjective Social Barriers. After the 1969 Curaçao uprising Paula served on the Rebuilding commission and the investigationary commission. He served as chair of the latter commission but resigned after being threatened.

Paula served as director of the National Archive of the Netherlands Antilles between 1969 and 1989. Paula was a lecturer, and later professor, of sociology, philosophy and human rights at the University of the Netherlands Antilles from 1990 to 2000. In his last three years he served as rector magnificus.

On 19 November 1993 a Curaçao status referendum was held. With the outcome in opposition to what she had campaigned for, Prime Minister Maria Liberia Peters resigned. She was succeeded by Suzanne Camelia-Römer. Paula was appointed as formateur by Governor of the Netherlands Antilles, Jaime Saleh. He managed to form a coalition. government which would rule until a government would be formed after the February 1994 general election. Paula himself served as Prime Minister of the Netherlands Antilles. His government was sworn in on 28 December 1993. He was succeeded when the government of Miguel Pourier was installed on 31 March 1994.

== Personal life ==
Paula married Monica Beddoe, a woman from Trinidad in 1966. The couple has two children. In 2011 the Peter Stuyvesant College was renamed in Paula's honour. Paula died on August 13, 2018, due to health complications.

== Current attention ==
In 2023 the Curaçao National Archaeological and Anthropological Memory Management started a rubric on their website titled Jandie Di, as part of their Cultural Heritage series. The aim is to republish fragments of his thought that are still relevant and might address current issues from angles that have not been engaged recently.

== Works ==
- From objective to subjective social barriers: A historico-philosophical analysis of certain negative attitudes among the negroid population of Curaçao (1967)
- Problemen rondom de emigratie van arbeiders uit de kolonie Curaçao naar Cuba (1973)
- De slavenopstand op Curaçao; een bronnenstudie van de desbetreffende originele overheidsdocumenten (1974)
- Slavery in a Nutshell (1987)
- Hoofdmomenten uit de staatkundige ontwikkeling van de Nederlandse Antillen (1989)
- Vrije slaven (1992)
- 1795: De slavenopstand op Curaçao (1994)
- The Cry of My Life: Bitterzoete herinneringen aan een levensweg vol kronkels (2005)
- Pensamentunan djayera resonando den aktualidat (2012)
- Resurekshon Un speransa nobo pa humanidat (2013)
- Breve Historia di Kas Real Hulandes (2013)

Political offices
Preceded by Susanne Camelia-Römer	Prime Minister of the Netherlands Antilles; 1993 — 1994	Succeeded by Miguel Arcangel Pourier
