= Jaime Saleh =

Dutch Antillean politician and former judge

His Excellency Jaime Saleh
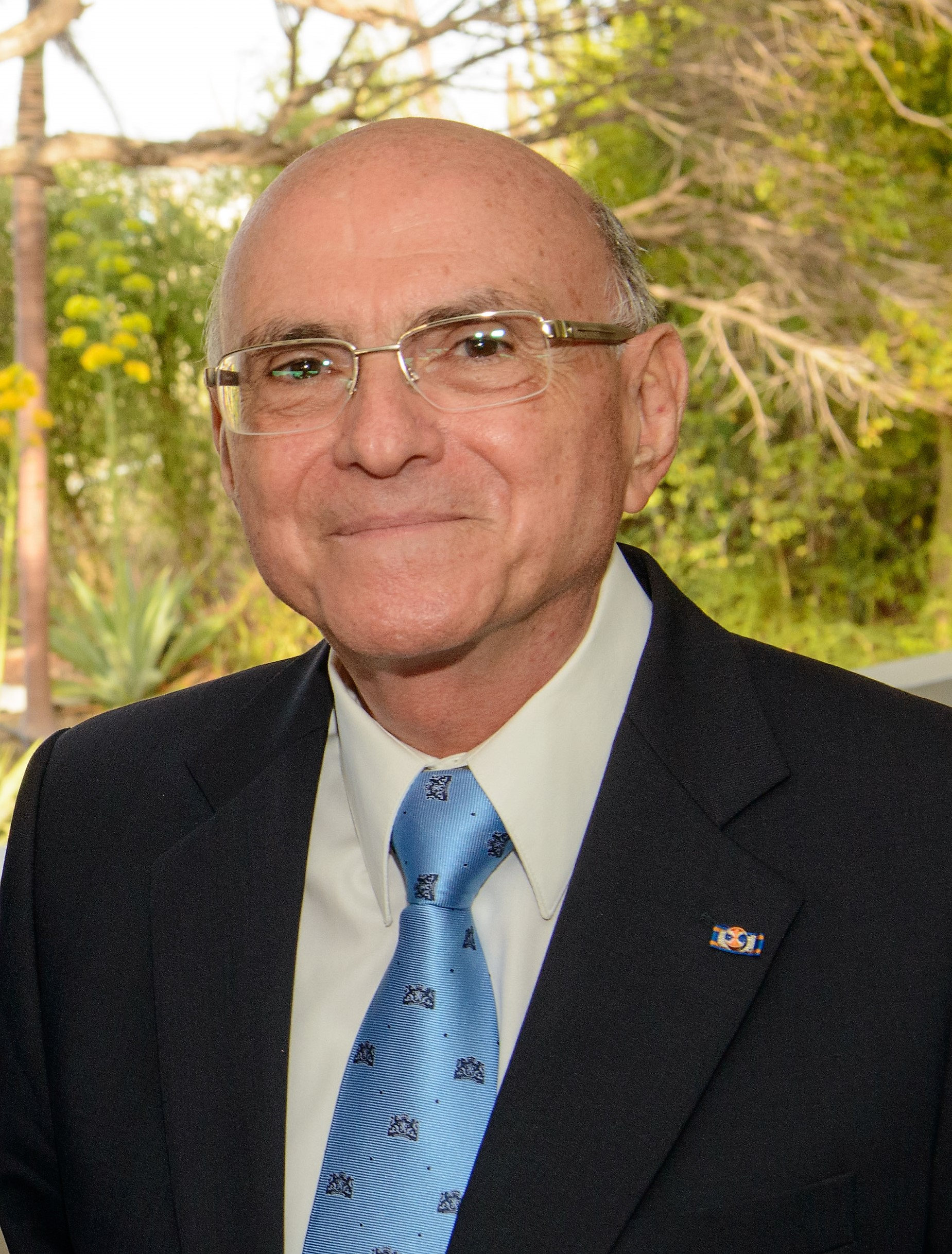
- Saleh in 2015

Governor of the Netherlands Antilles
- In office 16 January 1990 – 1 July 2002
- Monarch: Beatrix
- Prime Minister: Maria Liberia Peters; Suzanne Camelia-Römer; Alejandro Felipe Paula; Miguel Pourier; Suzanne Camelia-Römer; Miguel Pourier; Etienne Ys
- Preceded by: René Römer
- Succeeded by: Frits Goedgedrag

President of the Joint Court of Justice of the Netherlands Antilles
- In office 1 September 1979 – 15 January 1990
- Succeeded by: Meindert Wijnholt

Judge of the Joint Court of Justice of the Netherlands Antilles
- In office 1974 – 1 September 1979

Personal details
- Born: 21 April 1941 (age 85) Bonaire
- Occupation: Public prosecutor, attorney, judge

Jaime Mercelino Saleh (born 20 April 1941) is a Dutch Antillean politician and former judge. He was a judge on the Joint Court of Justice of the Netherlands Antilles from 1974 to 1990 and was its president from 1979. Saleh subsequently served as Governor of the Netherlands Antilles between 1990 and 2002.

== Early life and career ==
Saleh was born on Bonaire on 20 April 1941. He was the youngest child in a family of Lebanese immigrants and had eleven siblings. His father worked as a trader and eventually the family became wealthier, which allowed Saleh to study in the Netherlands. At age 13, he was sent to Nijmegen to enter into the Dominicus College. Having been raised a Roman Catholic, he was to become a Catholic novitiate and subsequently a priest. After three years, he changed schools and attended the gymnasium at the Bischoppelijke College in Sittard, which he finished in 1962. Saleh then started studying law at Utrecht University in the Netherlands and obtained his degree four years later. He subsequently worked shortly as a substitute prosecutor in the Netherlands.

In 1968, Saleh returned to the Caribbean part of the Kingdom of the Netherlands and started working as deputy public prosecutor. In 1971, he turned to the private sector and became an attorney. In 1974, Saleh was appointed as judge on the Joint Court of Justice of the Netherlands Antilles. From 1 September 1979 to 15 January 1990, he served as its president. He was succeeded by Meindert Wijnholt. Saleh also served as Vice President of the Dutch Navy Military Court for the Netherlands Antilles between 1978 and 1979. He was its president from 1979 to 1990.

== Governor of the Netherlands Antilles ==
Saleh was inaugurated as Governor of the Netherlands Antilles on 16 January 1990. He had already been thought of by Governor Bernadito M. Leito as his successor in 1983. During Saleh's early time in office, the Third Lubbers cabinet sought a different outlook on the Netherlands Antilles. In 1992, this led to a Common measure of Kingdom governance for Sint Maarten. Saleh as governor was heavily involved in the preventive oversight. The cabinet of Miguel Pourier took over this role in 1994.

In September 1995, after Hurricane Luis struck Sint Maarten and looting occurred, Saleh authorized the first use of Dutch military forces since the 1969 Curaçao uprising. In 1997, he also allowed the use of Dutch Marines at Koraal Specht prison on Curaçao. Saleh's time in office ended on 1 July 2002.

== Later career ==
Saleh was appointed Minister of State of the Dutch Caribbean in 2004. From 2005 to 2011, he was professor of constitutional law of the Kingdom of the Netherlands at Utrecht University. In 2008, he won the Nederlandse Juristen Vereniging Prize. At the inauguration of King Willem-Alexander on 30 April 2013, Saleh was the carrier of the Charter for the Kingdom of the Netherlands.

In September 2023 the Curaçao government under Gilmar Pisas asked Saleh to resign as Minister of State due to a scandal at insurance company ENNIA at which Saleh had been a long-term part of the board of commissioners and also received a substantial compensation. Saleh subsequently resigned the position.

== Personal life ==
Saleh is married and has four children. His daughter Eunice Saleh became President of the Joint Court of Justice of Aruba, Curaçao, Sint Maarten, and of Bonaire, Sint Eustatius and Saba in December 2016. Saleh was President of the Court when it was still known as Joint Court of Justice of the Netherlands Antilles.

Saleh is a Commander of the Order of Orange-Nassau.
