= The Identity Question =

Book by Robert Philipson

- Author: Robert Philipson
- Language: English
- Genre: Non-fiction
- Publisher: University Press of Mississippi
- Publication date: 2000
- Publication place: United States

The Identity Question: Blacks and Jews in Europe and America, by Robert Philipson, is a diasporic study of Black and Jewish consciousness in Europe and America throughout history. The book is separated into three parts, exploring different historical and philosophical perspectives on race over time.

== Flight From Egypt ==
The study first introduces the Exodus in Al Sharpton's Go Tell Pharaoh. The Exodus, the story of the Jews' flight from Egypt and Israel's delivery from Egypt is referenced in the title of autobiography of a Black author. Philipson claims that though many cultures are recognized by the myths associated with them, like the British with King Arthur and Americans with George Washington and the cherry tree, the singular myth of the Exodus functions as an identifier of both Black and Jewish cultures.

For Jewish culture, the Exodus is rehearsed yearly at Passover as a fundamental ritual to Jewish culture. It is then noted by Albert Raboteau that the Exodus story was appropriated by African slaves to give a way to articulate their sense of identity, which was based on the shared heritage of enslavement. As a result, the Exodus story was adopted by enslaved Blacks who related to the suffering of the Hebrews to their own, desired the Promised Land of Freedom, and sought the Moses who would free them.

== The Light From the West ==
The first book length Black autobiography by Olaudah Equiano is the first reference to Eighteenth century perspectives. In the autobiography, Equiano extends a comparison between Blacks and Jews in their cultural practices. In the comparison Equiano notes similarities such as rule by chiefs or elders, sacrifice or burnt offerings made to deities, and engagement in washings and purifications. From this comparison, Equiano claims that one people came from the other, stating that Blacks were descendants of biblical Jews. Equiano's conclusion acknowledged the prevailing environmentalism of the eighteenth century, depicting Africans as a degenerated species of humanity.

Though there were many theories to the racial differences between Blacks and Caucasians at the time, one by Baron de Montesquieu gained traction claiming climate accounted for the differences between people as well as societies. This theory not only affected Blacks at the time, but it also affected Jews. For Jews, the theory, according to defenders of contemporary Jews, to argue their manifest inferiority was, in fact, not innate and ineradicable. Baron de Montesquieu's environmentalism-centric view continued further in Isaac de Pinto's explanation of the differences between Jews in Europe, stating that Montesquieu's claim explained the 'wealthy and cultured Sephardim in southern France' and the 'miserable, uncouth Ashkenazim of eastern France'.

The perspective on Blacks and Jews changed once again when the Jewish community came under attack for a money-lending role in the local economy and Christian Wilhelm Dohm, a Prussian official, was called upon to compose a treatise allowing Jews fair treatment by the state. In his writing, Dohm did not distinguish between Ashkenazim and Sephardim, but instead claimed the shortcomings of Jews were, in fact, the shortcomings of the trading class and can be changed by altering their circumstances.

== Mid-Century Perspectives ==
Nineteenth century perspectives closely resembled those of the eighteenth century in that racial differences were essential in understanding human behavior. According to Philipson, there were twentieth century publicists of racism that could make claims about the inferiority of Blacks and Jews based on the environmentalism of the eighteenth century and scientific racism of the nineteenth.

However, there occurred a shift from intellectuals such as Franz Boas who argued that racial differences were not a result of geographical determinism, but rather emerged from the interaction with preexisting cultures that had risen out of historical circumstance. Boas never entirely rid of the notion of using race as a meaningful category of species classification, Boas' work contributed to the notion that social conditions were just as powerful a factor as biology is in human development.

== Reception ==
The historian Allison Blakely stated, "This rich, thought-provoking book is not easily accessible for the general reader." He concluded, "Nevertheless, for the patient reader, Philipson presents a very insightful collection of commentary essays on the search by selected modern Black and Jewish intellectuals for both their personal identity and their understanding of the place of their respective groups in the world." Emily Miller Budick wrote in the journal American Studies that the book is a "scholarly, well-researched, almost encyclopedic study".
