= Rutsel Martha =

Dutch lawyer (1955–2026)

Rutsel Silvestre Jacinto Martha
- Born: 31 December 1955; Willemstad, Curaçao, Netherlands Antilles
- Died: 3 June 2026 (aged 70); Willemstad, Curaçao, Netherlands Antilles
- Education: Leiden University; American University Washington College of Law
- Occupations: Jurist, Legal scholar, Minister of Justice of the Netherlands Antilles, Diplomat
- Political party: Partido Nashonal di Pueblo
- Honours: Officer in the Order of Orange-Nassau

Rutsel Silvestre Jacinto Martha (31 December 1955 – 3 June 2026) was a jurist, legal scholar, former diplomat and former government minister, specialising in public international law. He was an appointed Officer of the Order of Orange-Nassau of the Kingdom of the Netherlands. He held senior legal positions in international organisations, including serving as Executive Director of Legal Affairs and General Counsel at Interpol (2004–2008) and General Counsel and Director of Legal Affairs at the International Fund for Agricultural Development (IFAD) from 2008 to 2013.

Early in his career, Martha worked as a legal adviser at the Central Bank of the Netherlands Antilles and counsel in the International Monetary Fund (IMF). Martha later served in governmental and diplomatic roles, including Minister Plenipotentiary (1989–1998) of the Netherlands Antilles in Brussels. In this role, he worked within the Permanent Representation of the Kingdom of the Netherlands to the European Union to advocate for the islands (Aruba, Bonaire, Curaçao, Sint Eustatius and Saba). He was responsible for protecting the interests of the Dutch Caribbean within the European institutions. He was also Minister of Justice of the Netherlands Antilles (1998–2002). Throughout his career, he represented the institutions he worked for in GATT-related litigation, as well as cases brought before the Court of Justice of the European Union and the International Labour Organisation (ILO).

Following his service in international organisations, Martha went into the private sector and established a legal practice in London focusing on public international law, including international organisation law, international financial institutions, treaty-based dispute settlement, and investment arbitration sanctions, and Interpol-related matters such as Red Notice and extradition cases.

He was the author of several works on public international law, including The Financial Obligation in International Law (2015) and of The Legal Foundations of INTERPOL (second edition, 2020), which was cited in proceedings before the English High Court of Justice and which included a foreword by Ronald Noble, who served as Secretary General of Interpol during Martha's tenure as Executive Director of Legal Affairs and General Counsel.

== Education ==
Martha studied law at Leiden University in the Netherlands, where he specialised in public international law and international organisations. He later earned a Master of Laws in international legal studies from the American University Washington College of Law in Washington, D.C., before obtaining a Doctor of Laws from Leiden University. His doctoral research was supervised by Pieter Kooijmans. His doctoral dissertation, The Jurisdiction to Tax in International Law (Kluwer Law and Taxation, 1989), was later published as a book and was awarded the Mitchell B. Carroll Prize by the International Fiscal Association (IFA) in 1989.

== Professional career and academic experience ==
From 1983 to 1985, Martha was a lecturer at the University of the Netherlands Antilles. From 1985 to 1987, he worked as legal counsel at the Central Bank of Curaçao, and from 1987 to 1989 as legal counsel in the Legal Department of the International Monetary Fund (IMF) in Washington, D.C..

From 1989 to 1998, Martha served as Minister Plenipotentiary of the Netherlands Antilles in Brussels where, as adviser to the Council of Ministers, he represented and advanced the diplomatic interests of the Netherlands Antilles in relations with the European Union. In that capacity, he was involved in negotiations concerning the European Union's Overseas Countries and Territories Association (OCT) Decision. From 1998 to 2002, he served as Minister of Justice of the Netherlands Antilles, first in the cabinet of Suzanne Camelia-Römer and subsequently in the cabinet of Miguel Pourier. From 2002 to 2004 he was a member of the Island Council of Curaçao.

From 2004 to 2008, Martha served as Executive Director of Legal Affairs and General Counsel at Interpol, where he oversaw the organisation's legal framework and advised on compliance with international law. From 2008 to 2013, he served as General Counsel and Director of Legal Affairs at IFAD, a specialised agency of the United Nations dedicated to financing agricultural development and reducing rural poverty in developing countries.

From 2007 to 2013, he held a visiting professorship in law at New York University School of Law (NYU) and the National University of Singapore Faculty of Law (NUS).

After leaving his role at IFAD in 2013, Martha entered private legal practice. He established a London-based international law practice, where he worked on matters of public international law, international organisation law, sanctions, extradition, and dispute settlement involving states and international institutions, including investor-State arbitration.

He was also a member of the Dutch Advisory Committee on Public International Law (CAVV), an independent advisory body that gives legal opinions to the Dutch government on interpretation and development of international law.

== Key publications and writings ==
Martha authored books and journal articles in the fields of public international law, international financial law, and the law of international organisations.

His doctoral dissertation, The Jurisdiction to Tax in International Law: Theory and Practice of Legislative Fiscal Jurisdiction (Kluwer Law and Taxation, 1989), was later published as a book and examines state jurisdiction to tax under international law. He published The Legal Foundations of INTERPOL (Hart Publishing, 2010), which examines the legal framework governing Interpol and related institutional procedures., which was later updated and co-authored. He subsequently authored Tax Treatment of International Civil Servants (Martinus Nijhoff, 2009), which examines the taxation of staff of international organisations, and The Financial Obligation in International Law (Oxford University Press, 2015), which analyses financial obligations under public international law, including state debt and institutional liabilities.

== Expertise ==
His areas of expertise included public international law, international law enforcement co-operation, international monetary and economic law, international taxation, and European Union law.

His professional practice focused on Interpol-related matters, treaty-based dispute settlement, matters involving politically exposed persons, sanctions, extradition, mutual legal assistance, and asset freezing. He had experience in proceedings before international courts, arbitral tribunals and international administrative tribunals.

He was involved in the distribution of the assets and liabilities of the Central Bank of the Netherlands Antilles following the departure of Aruba from the Netherlands Antilles, and served as Secretary to the Gold Fund of the Netherlands Antilles and Aruba.

== Death ==
Martha died in Curaçao on 3 June 2026.

== Honours ==
In 2004, he was appointed an Officer in the Order of Orange-Nassau of the Kingdom of the Netherlands.

== Published works ==
Books

- The Financial Obligation in International Law (Oxford University Press, 2015) was cited in the English High Court of Justice in Law Debenture Trust Corporation plc v Ukraine [2017] EWHC 655 (Comm).
- The Legal Foundations of INTERPOL (Hart Publishing, 2010; 2nd ed. 2020), co-authored with Courtney Grafton and Stephen Bailey, includes a foreword by Ronald Noble, who served as Secretary General of INTERPOL during Martha’s tenure as General Counsel.
- Tax Treatment of International Civil Servants (Martinus Nijhoff Publishers, 2009).
- The Jurisdiction to Tax in International Law (Kluwer Law and Taxation, 1989).

Book chapters

- “Exemptions from Taxes and Custom Duties (Article II Sections 7-8 General Convention, Article III Sections 9-10 Special Agencies Convention), and Annex XVI International Fund for Agricultural Development” in August Reinisch and Peter Bachmayer (eds), The Conventions on the Privileges and Immunities of the United Nations and its Specialized Agencies (OUP, 2016)
- “Attribution of Conduct after the ICJ Advisory Opinion on the Global Mechanism” in Mauricio Ragazzi (ed), Essays on the responsibility of international organizations in memory of Sir Ian Brownlie (Brill/Martinus Nijhoff, 2013)
- “The Treatment of Monetary Problems by International Administrative Tribunals” in Olufemi Adekunle Elias (ed), The Development and Effectiveness of International Administrative Law (Brill/Martinus Nijhoff, 2012)
- “The General Counsel as a Transactional Lawyer: Structuring the Commitments to Replenish the Resources of the International Fund for Agricultural Development” in Asif H. Qureshi and Xuan Gao (eds), International Economic Organizations and Law – The Perspective and Role of the Legal Counsel (Wolters Kluwer Law & Business, 2012)
- “International Financial Institutions and Claims of Private Parties: Immunity Obliges” in Hassane Cisse, Daniel D. Bradlow and Benedict Kingsbury (eds), The World Bank Legal Review, Volume 3: International Financial Institutions and Global Legal Governance (2012)
- “Challenging Acts of INTERPOL in Domestic Courts” in August Reinisch (ed), Challenging Acts of International Organizations Before National Courts (OUP, 2010)

Journal articles

- ‘On Their Sovereign’s Secret Service: Special Envoys Detained while in Transit’ (with Kit De Vriese) (2023) 22(3) Chinese Journal of International Law 529
- ‘International Organizations as Sovereign Bondholders – An Unexplored Dimension of the Sovereign Debt Crisis’ (2013) 10(1) Manchester Journal of International Economic Law 2
- ‘Going Against the Grain: When Private Rules Shouldn’t Apply to Public Institutions’ (with Sarah Dadush) (2013) 9(1) International Organizations Law Review 87
- ‘International Organizations and the Global Financial Crisis: The status of their Assets in Insolvency and Forced Liquidation Proceedings’ (2009) 6(1) International Organizations Law Review 117
- ‘Effects of Self-Government and Supra-Nationalism in the International Monetary Fund: the Case of the Kingdom of the Netherlands’ (2005) 2(1) Manchester Journal of International Economic Law 2
- ‘Capacity to Sue and Be Sued under WTO Law’ (2004) 3(1) World Trade Review 27
- ‘The Duty to Exercise Judgment on the Fruitfulness of Actions in World Trade Law’ (2001) 35(5) Journal of World Trade 1035
- ‘Presumptions and Burden of Proof in World Trade Law’ (1997) 14(1) Journal of International Arbitration 67
- ‘Precedent in World Trade Law’ (1997) 44(3) Netherlands International Law Review 346
- ‘Representation of Parties in World Trade Disputes’ (1997) 31(2) Journal of World Trade 83
- ‘World Trade Disputes Settlement and the Exhaustion of Local Remedies Rule’ (1996) 30(4) Journal of World Trade 107
- ‘The Fund Agreement and the Surrender of Monetary Sovereignty to the European Community’ (1993) 30(4) Common Market Law Review 749
- ‘Determining the origin of goods for the purposes of article 133 of the EEC Treaty’ (1990) 3(2) Leiden Journal of International Law 167
- ‘Preferred Creditor Status under International Law: The Case of the International Monetary Fund’ (1990) 39(4) International and Comparative Law Quarterly 801
- ‘The Debate on Profound Changes of Circumstances and the Interpretation of Gold Clauses in International Transport Treaties’ (1985) 32(1) Netherlands International Law Review 48
