= Rose Mary Allen =

Curaçaoan anthropologist

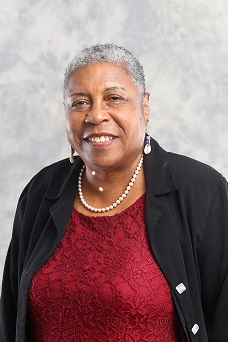
Rose Mary Allen (2021)

Rose Mary Allen (born 1950) is a Curaçaoan anthropologist, who has published on the oral history of former enslaved people of the Dutch Caribbean islands. Her dissertation, "Di ki manera: a social history of Afro-Curaçaoans, 1863-1917" draws largely on the collected oral histories of Afro-Curaçaoans. She holds a PhD and is a lecturer at the University of Curaçao.

In 2015 she was awarded a knighthood in the Order of Orange-Nassau by the Netherlands and she also won the Cola Debrot Prize.
