= Curaçao Volunteer Corps =

- Vrijwilligers Korps Curaçao
- Founded: 23 June 1929; 95 years ago
- Countries: Curaçao
- Allegiance: Kingdom of the Netherlands
- Type: Volunteer defense unit
- Headquarters: Suffisant Naval Barracks
- Engagements: World War II

Commanders
- Notable commanders: Carlos Nicolas Winkel

The Curaçao Volunteer Corps (Note: Sometimes also called Volunteer Corps Curaçao or Curaçao Corps of Volunteers.) (Dutch: Vrijwilligers Korps Curaçao; VKC) is a volunteer defense unit of Curaçao that was founded on 23 June 1929. During the Second World War it was part of the regular defense force in Curaçao and took part in the defense of the island.

== History ==
The Curaçao Volunteer Corps (VKC) was founded on 23 June 1929 as response to the attack led by Rafael Simón Urbina on Curaçao on 8 June 1929. On this date Rafael and his partner Gustavo Machado Morales led a group of 45 armed Venezuelan workers and managed to take over the garrison that was stationed at Waterfort and wreak havoc in the streets of Curaçao. They also took hostages, including Governor Leonard Albert Fruytier. During the surprise attack one officer died and several agents, regulars and military policemen were wounded, two so heavily that they later died. The attack led to shock in the Netherlands and on the Dutch islands in the Dutch West Indies. While the Netherlands responded by sending troops and warships, the citizens of Curaçao also decided to take some measures themselves to prevent such an attack in the future. Fifteen days after the attack the businessman Carlos Nicolas "Shon Cai" Winkel organized a meeting at his estate which led to the creation of the VKC. At the time of its creation the corps consisted of 300 to 400 volunteers and were led by Winkel together with the lieutenants Meyboom and Insbrucker. The volunteers were trained at first by regular officers of the marines, but later by officers of the military or police.

=== Second World War ===
In 1938, amid rising tensions in the world, Governor Gielliam J.J. Wouters of Curaçao and Dependencies presented his plans for the defense of Curaçao and ordered the VKC to be joined to the defense force of Curaçao. After the Second World War broke out in 1939 additional measures were taken and the volunteers of the VKC were mobilized and called for service. Personal circumstances of the volunteers were taken into account as much as possible, together with the interests of their employers. However, due to lack of personnel most waiver requests were rejected. Instead a rotation system was introduced so that business operations of companies would not be severely disrupted by the departure of employees that had to serve. At the time the measures were taken the VKC consisted of around 100 volunteers. The next year, in 1940, this had grown to 300 volunteers.

During the Second World War the VKC performed several important tasks. Its volunteers manned a number of coastal batteries together with personnel of the Royal Netherlands Navy, Army, KNIL, Marines and the Antillean Militia. (Note: In Dutch the Antillean Militia was known as Antilliaanse Schutterij or sometimes as Curaçaose Schutterij.) Some were used for civic watch duties at Bullenbaai, Isla, Caracasbaai, Fuikbaai and Steenrijk. While others helped with the training of recruits of the Antillean Militia. After the United States declared the Caribbean free from the dangers of war in September 1943, several foreign and Dutch military units that were stationed on Curaçao left for other territories. Meanwhile, the VKC was still active on Curaçao and celebrated on 23 June 1944 its fifteenth anniversary. That same year the heavy coastal batteries, which were manned by several volunteers of the VKC, were no longer held in readiness for immediate action.

== Ranks and insignia ==
Officers
NATO code	OF-10	OF-9	OF-8	OF-7	OF-6	OF-5	OF-4	OF-3	OF-2	OF-1
Vrijwilligers Korps; Curaçao
Vrijwilligers Korps; Curaçao						Kolonel	Luitenant-kolonel	Majoor	Kapitein	1e Luitenant	2e Luitenant

Student officers
NATO code	OF(D)
Vrijwilligers Korps; Curaçao
Vrijwilligers Korps; Curaçao	Vaandrig

Enlisted ranks
NATO code	OR-9	OR-8	OR-7	OR-6	OR-5	OR-4	OR-3	OR-2		OR-1
Vrijwilligers Korps; Curaçao
Vrijwilligers Korps; Curaçao	Staf adjudant onderofficier	Adjudant onderofficer	Sergeant-majoor	Sergeant		Korporaal		Soldaat 1ste klas	Soldaat 2de klas	Soldaat
