= Suzanne Camelia-Römer =

Curaçao politician

Susanne Camelia-Römer
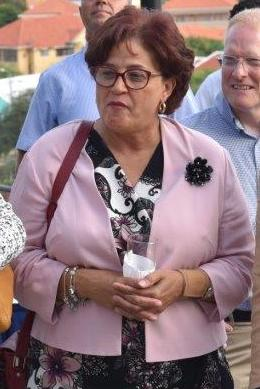
- Römer in 2017

Prime Minister of the Netherlands Antilles
- In office 25 November 1993 – 28 December 1993
- Monarch: Beatrix
- Governor: Jaime Saleh
- Preceded by: Maria Liberia Peters
- Succeeded by: Alejandro Felipe Paula
- In office 14 May 1998 – 8 November 1999
- Preceded by: Miguel Pourier
- Succeeded by: Miguel Pourier

Personal details
- Born: Suzanne Francisca Coromoto Römer; 4 January 1959 (age 67) Curaçao
- Party: PNP (until 2017); PIN
- Spouse: Carl Camelia

Susanne Camelia-Römer, officially Suzy F.C. Camelia-Römer (born 4 January 1959) is a Curaçao politician of the National People's Party (PNP) and a lawyer. She served two times as Prime Minister of the Netherlands Antilles in 25 November 1993 – 28 December 1993 (1st time ad interim) and 14 May 1998 – 8 November 1999 (2nd time). She was also Minister of Justice from 1992–1994 and Minister of National Recovery and Economic Affairs from 1999–2002. As of March 2016 she is the Minister for Traffic, Transport and Urban Planning of Curaçao. She kept this position in the Hensley Koeiman cabinet which was installed on 23 December 2016.

Political offices
| Preceded by Maria Liberia Peters | Prime Minister of the Netherlands Antilles; 1993 | Succeeded by Alejandro Felipe Paula |
| Preceded by Miguel Pourier | Prime Minister of the Netherlands Antilles; 1998 — 1999 | Succeeded by Miguel Pourier |
