= Maria Liberia Peters =

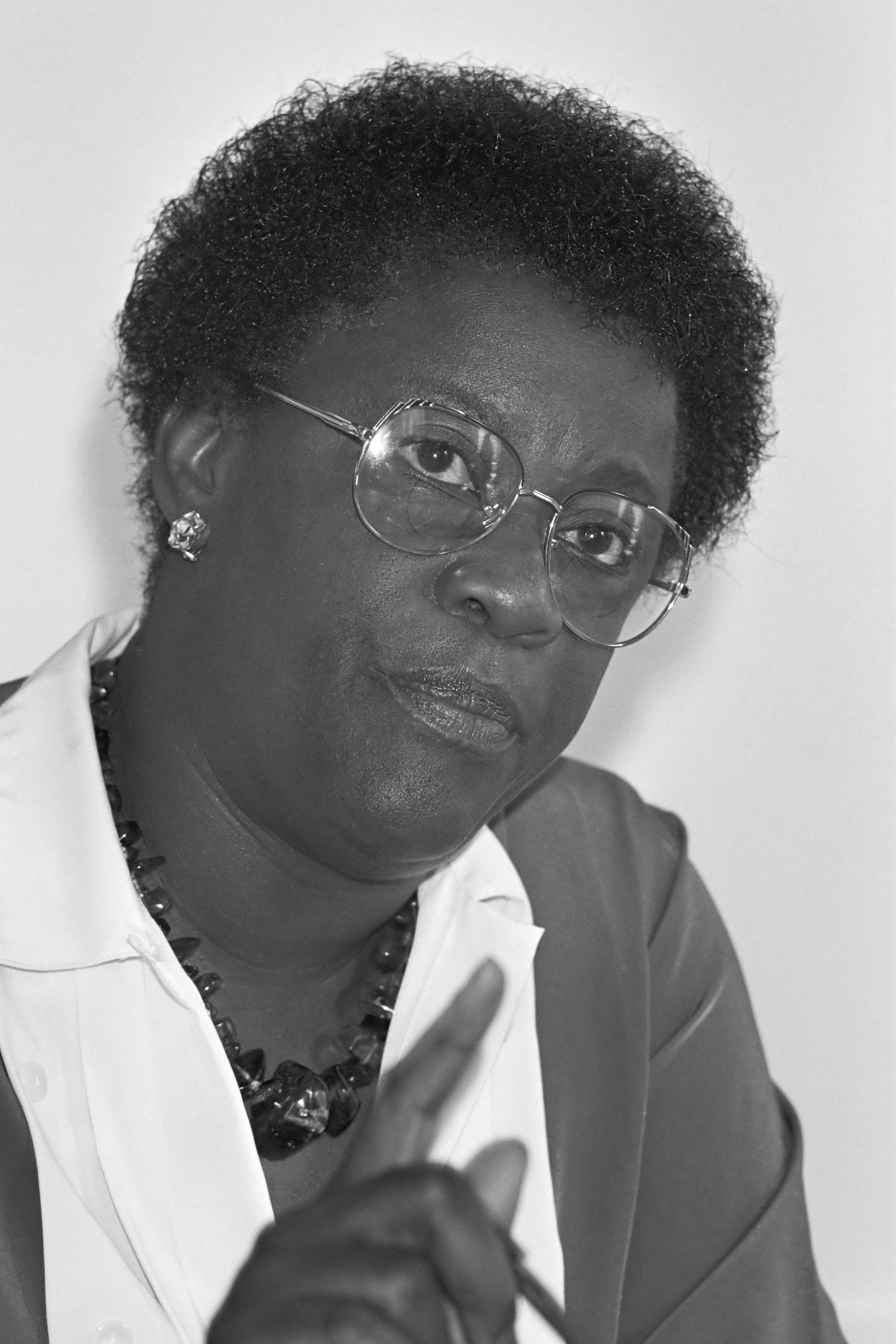
- Liberia Peters in 1988

Prime Minister of the Netherlands Antilles
- In office 1988–1994
- Preceded by: Don Martina
- Succeeded by: Suzy Camelia-Römer
- In office 1984–1986
- Preceded by: Don Martina
- Succeeded by: Don Martina

Personal details
- Born: 20 May 1941 (age 83); Willemstad, Curaçao
- Political party: Nationale Volkspartij

Maria Liberia Peters, also known as Maria Liberia-Peters, (born 20 May 1941) was the Prime Minister of the Netherlands Antilles from 1984 to 1986 and from 1988 to 1994.

== Life ==
Born Maria Peters in Willemstad, Curaçao, Netherlands Antilles, she attended school and earned a teaching degree in the Netherlands. She later married Niels Liberia, a civil servant. Together they adopted two children.

Liberia Peters fell into politics almost accidentally. She was involved in children's issues alongside teaching as her main profession. She felt that going into politics was the only way to achieve substantial changes, saying, "There comes a moment when you realize that if you really want to make a difference, the only way is through politics, and then you walk right into it. In my own case, I thought. Well, I’ll try it, and if I don’t like it, I’ll say goodbye. But then you realize you’ve entered a one-way street, and you remain because you are continually challenged."

Her road to politics began in the 1970s, when she started parents' groups and became a member of the National People's Party. In 1975, after being encouraged by others to run for office, she earned a seat on the Curaçao Island Council where she stayed a member for the next five years. In 1982 she was appointed to the legislature of the Netherlands Antilles and also became the Minister of Economic Affairs. After the coalition government she worked under collapsed in June 1984, she agreed to form a new coalition and was elected as Prime Minister, a position that she held from 1984 to 1986 and later from 1988 to 1994. She attempted a third run in 1994 but her party lost the election. She did however, remain in Parliament.

Prime Minister Maria Liberia Peters is a member of the Council of Women World Leaders, an International network of current and former women presidents and prime ministers whose mission is to mobilize the highest-level women leaders globally for collective action on issues of critical importance to women and equitable development.

== Honours ==
- Netherlands: Grand Officer of the Order of Orange-Nassau
- Colombia: Grand Officer of the Order of Boyacá
- Venezuela: Grand Officer of the Order of Sol de Carabobo (1993)
- Venezuela Grand Cordon of the Order of the Liberator
- On 12 January 2023, Liberia-Peters was awarded an honorary doctorate from the University of Curaçao for her efforts as a politician for the country of Curaçao.

== See also ==
- First women lawyers around the world

Political offices
Preceded by Dominico Martina	Prime Minister of the Netherlands Antilles; 1984 — 1986	Succeeded by Dominico Martina
Preceded by Dominico Martina	Prime Minister of the Netherlands Antilles; 1988 — 1993	Succeeded by Susanne Camelia-Römer
