= René Römer =

Dutch academic and politician (1929-2003)

Governor of the Netherlands Antilles
- In office 1983–1990
- Preceded by: Ben Leito
- Succeeded by: Jaime Saleh

Personal details
- Born: René Antonio Römer; 2 July 1929 Willemstad, Curaçao
- Died: 25 February 2003 (aged 73) Curaçao

René Antonio Römer (2 July 1929 – 25 February 2003) was Governor of the Netherlands Antilles from 1983 to 1990. He was also a professor of sociology at the University of the Netherlands Antilles and at the University of Groningen in the Netherlands.

Political offices
Preceded by Ben Leito	Governor of the Netherlands Antilles; 1983–1990	Succeeded by Jaime Saleh
