= Trade unions in Curaçao =

- National organization(s): Trade Union Centre of Curaçao (SSK)

International Labour Organization
- Curaçao has separate territorial status but is an ILO member via the Netherlands

Convention declaration
- Freedom of Association: 25 June 1951
- Right to Organise: No declaration

Trade unions in Curaçao have a total membership of 5,800 as of 2009.

Unions played no role in Curaçao before 1922. There were two possible reasons for this: it can be attributed to workers, as members of a racist colonial society, not yet being ready for this level of organizations and they may have been avoiding repression from the government. In 1913, a large dock strike, the earliest recorded strike by free workers in the history of Curaçao, took place on the island, but it was entirely a wildcat strike. Employers brought in workers from St. Thomas and Venezuela and broke the strike. It did not give rise to any permanent workers' organizations.

In April 1922, another dock strike broke out, again without union involvement. The Royal West Indian Mail Service (KWIM), acting on behalf of a number of shipping companies, lowered dockworkers' wages. It claimed that wages had risen excessively during World War I. The Roman Catholic People's Union intervened and mediated negotiations between workers and employers. The People's Union was not a labor union, but mostly a middle class organization looking to advance the interests of the people. When negotiations failed, workers decided to form a Dock Workers' Union on July 1. It was able to negotiate a compromise with the local management of the KWIM to end the strike. When the company's general management in New York rejected this compromise, a riot ensued at its offices in the Curaçao capital of Willemstad. The police needed military assistance to put it down, killing four and wounding nineteen in the process. As a result, the KWIM accepted the original compromise.

Under the guise of the People's Union, further unions were founded throughout the 1930s, including the Shop and Office Workers' Union in 1934, the Drivers' Union in 1935, and the Roman Catholic Laborers' Union in the course of a strike at a Royal Dutch Shell plant in 1936. These unions were largely driven by their leaders while the rank and file had as yet little interest in unionizing for a number of reasons: Despite the severe global economic crisis, Curaçao's economy was thriving and drawing large numbers of immigrants, mostly from Portuguese Madeira and the British Caribbean islands. This created a heterogenous workforce. Meanwhile, the government reacted repressively to workers' attempts to organize, as did Shell, the biggest employer.

In recent decades, union membership in Curaçao has fallen. It declined from 9,000 in 1957 to 6,000 in 1988 and 5,100 in 2001, but rose to 5,800 in 2009.

== Bibliography ==
- Docherty, James C.; van der Velden, Sjaak (2012). Historical Dictionary of Organized Labor. Lanham/Toronto/Plymouth, UK: Scarecrow Press.
- Römer, R.A. (1981). "Labour unions and labour conflict in Curacao". New West Indian Guide / Nieuwe West-Indische Gids. 55 (1): 138–153.
