= Ben Leito =

20th century politician in the Netherlands Antilles

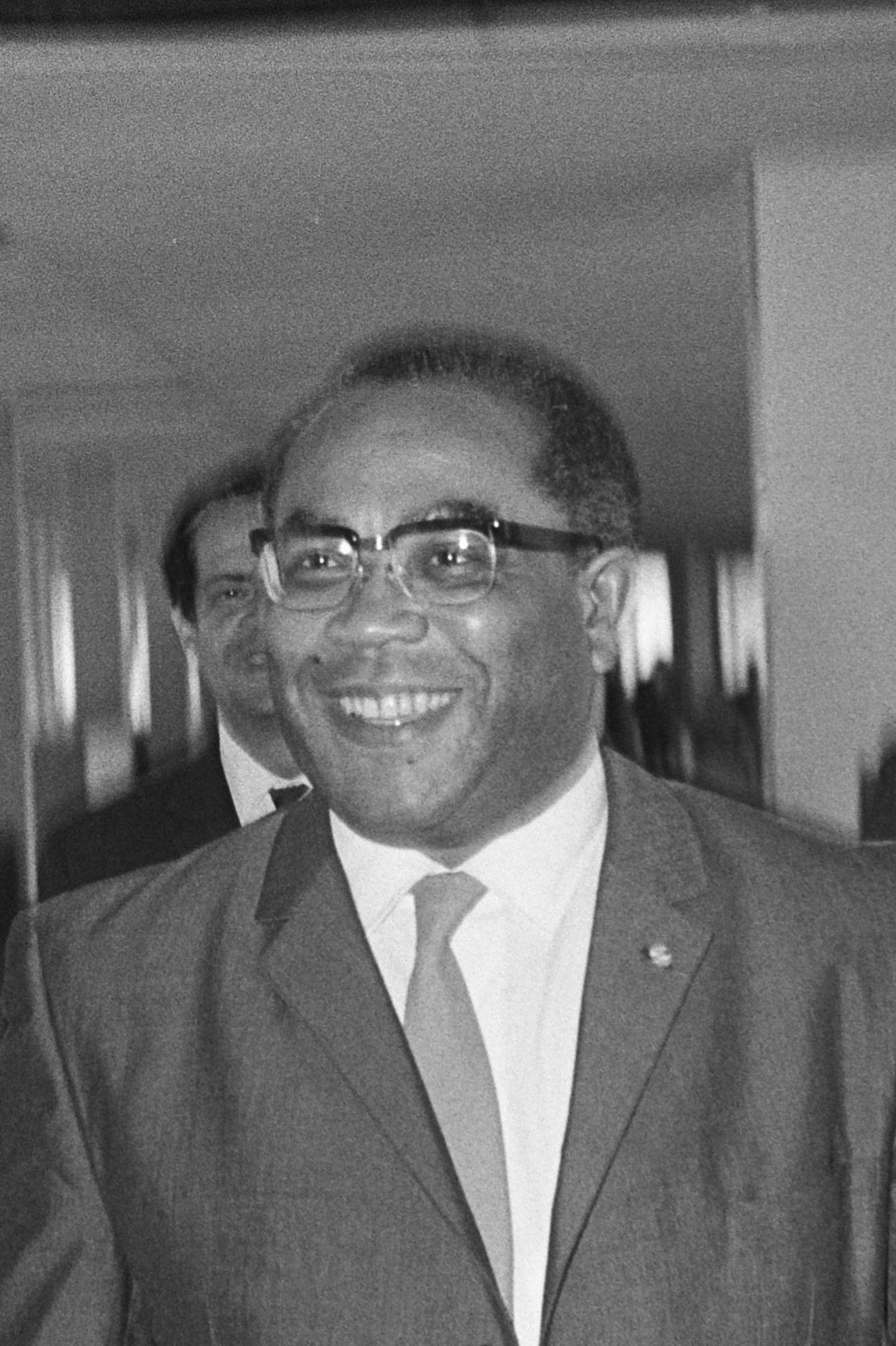
- Leito (1970)

Council of State
- In office 1 March 1987 – 6 February 1993

Governor of the Netherlands Antilles
- In office 16 June 1970 – 30 April 1983
- Preceded by: Cola Debrot
- Succeeded by: René Römer

Personal details
- Born: Bernadito M. Leito; 6 February 1923 Curaçao
- Died: September 1996 (aged 73)
- Party: Catholic People's Party
- Occupation: economist, politician and administrator

Bernadito M. "Ben" Leito (6 February 1923 – September 1996) was a Curaçaoan economist, politician and administrator. He served as Governor of the Netherlands Antilles from 1970 until 1983, and on the Dutch Council of State from 1987 until 1993.

== Biography ==
Leito was born on 6 February 1923 in Curaçao. He went to the Netherlands to attend the Hogere Burgerschool (high school) in Leiden. In 1945, he studied economy at Tilburg University, and graduated in 1950.

In 1952, Leito became a civil servant in Curaçao, and started to work for the finance department in 1953. He was a candidate in the 1954 Netherlands Antilles general election for the Catholic People's Party, but did not get elected. In 1961, he became head of finance for Curaçao, and was promoted head of finance for the Netherlands Antilles in 1965. In 1968, he served as acting Lieutenant governor of Curaçao.

The 1969 Curaçao uprising resulted in the resignation of the Cola Debrot as Governor of the Netherlands Antilles. On 30 December 1969, Leito was appointed acting governor. The States General of the Netherlands nominated Efraïn Jonckheer as new governor, however the Estates of the Netherlands Antilles rejected the nomination, and Leito was installed as Governor of the Netherlands Antilles effective 16 June 1970. Leito was the first Afro-Curaçaoan governor of the Antilles.

In the early 1970s, the Dutch government under Joop den Uyl tried to persuade the Netherlands Antilles to seek independence. Leito was opposed to independence for the islands, and provided backing for the Isa-Beaujon and Evertsz cabinets in their denouncement. In 1980, Leito applied to become a member of the Council of State, the advisory body for the Dutch government, however his application was rejected. In March 1983, Leito resigned as governor effective 30 April. On 1 March 1987, Leito was appointed to the Council of State, and served until 6 February 1993.

Leito died in September 1996, at the age of 73.

== Honours ==
- Netherlands Commander in the Order of the Netherlands Lion.
- Netherlands Officer in the Order of Orange-Nassau.
- Venezuela Grand Cordon in the Order of the Liberator.
- Dominican Republic Grand Cross in the Order of Merit of Duarte, Sánchez and Mella.
