= Allison Blakely =

American historian

Allison Blakely is an academic historian.

== Life ==
He graduated from the University of Oregon, and from the University of California, Berkeley with an M.A. and Ph.D. He taught for thirty years at Howard University 1971–2001. He has taught at Boston University since 2001.

From 2006 to 2009 he was President of the Phi Beta Kappa society.

== Awards ==
- 1988 American Book Award
- Woodrow Wilson Fellowship
- Mellon Fellowship
- Fulbright-Hays Fellowship
- Ford Foundation Fellowship

== Works ==
- Blacks in the Dutch World: The Evolution of Racial Imagery in a Modern Society. Indiana University Press. 2001. ISBN 978-0-253-21433-1.
- Russia and the Negro: Blacks in Russian history and thought. Howard University Press. 1986. ISBN 978-0-88258-146-0.
- The Socialist Revolutionary Party, 1901-1907: the populist response to the industrialization of Russia. Blakely. 1971.
