= Cola Debrot =

Dutch writer, lawyer, doctor and politician

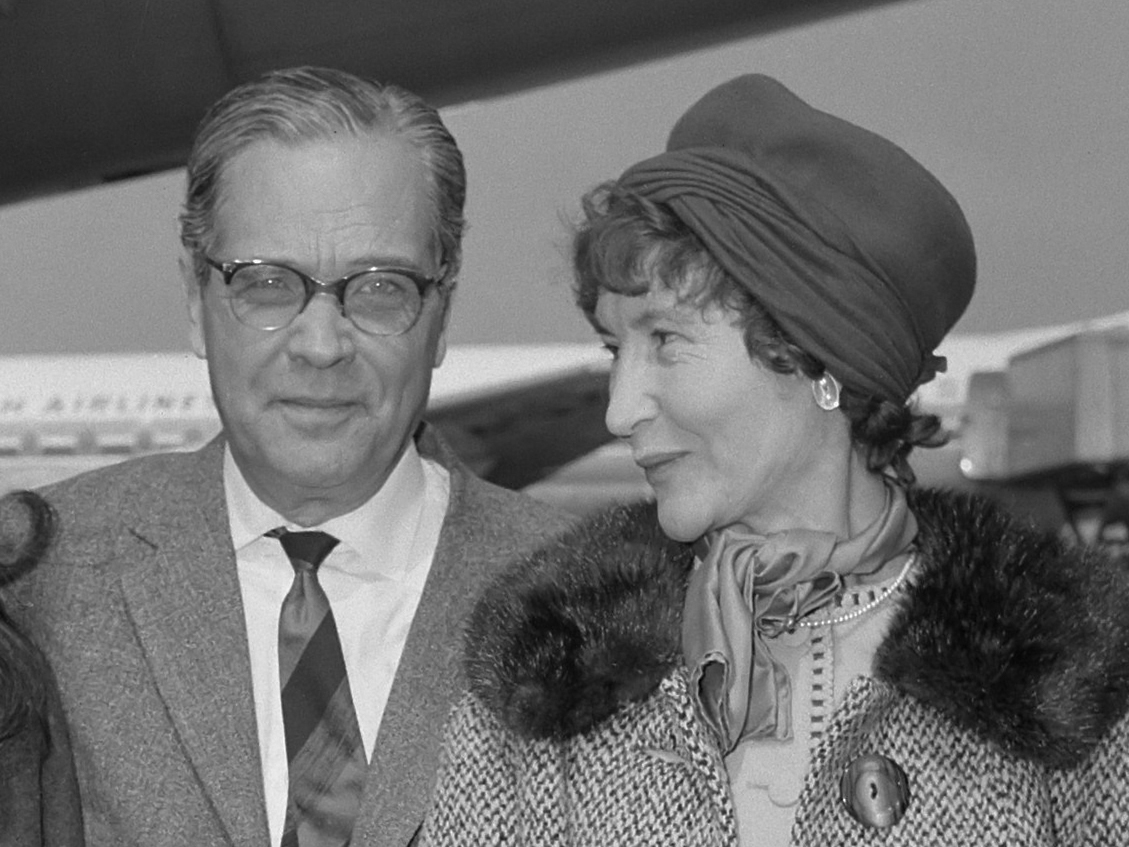

Governor of the Netherlands Antilles
- In office 1962–1970
- Preceded by: Aldert van Bruggen
- Succeeded by: Bernadito Leito

Personal details
- Born: Nicolaas Debrot; 4 May 1902 Kralendijk, Bonaire, Netherlands
- Died: 3 December 1981 (aged 79) Amsterdam, Netherlands
- Education: Utrecht University

Nicolaas Debrot (4 May 1902 – 3 December 1981) was a Dutch-Antillean writer, doctor, and politician who served as the Governor of the Netherlands Antilles from 1962 to 1970. He was the first person born in the Antilles to serve as its governor.

Debrot's writing career started in 1935 when his first work, Mijn zuster de negerin, was published.

== Early life and education ==
Nicolaas Debrot was born in Kralendijk, Bonaire, in 1902. His mother was from Venezuela. Spanish and Papiamento were spoken in his family's house and he learned Dutch. He attended grammar school in Nijmegen and studied law in Utrecht. He lived on the Oudegracht and became friends with Pyke Koch, Jan Engelman, and Martinus Nijhoff.

Debrot studied medicine from 1931 to 1942. During World War II Debrot operated a medical practice in Amsterdam. Willem Frederik Hermans regularly visited Debrot's practice and Debrot introduced Hermans to his patients as Dr. Klondike, which Debrot later used in his book Dokter Klondyke. Debrot worked as a doctor in Curaçao after the war ended.

== Writing ==
Debrot first work, the novella Mijn zuster de negerin (My Sister the Negress), was published by Forum in 1935, and it was adapted into a film in 1980. The literary magazine Criterium was founded by Debrot, Han G. Hoekstra, and Ed. Hoornik in 1940. Debrot also worked as a ballet critic.

== Politics ==
In 1952, Debrot became Minister Plenipotentiary of the Netherlands Antilles. He was the Governor of the Netherlands Antilles from 1962 to 1970, and was the first native of the Antilles to hold that position.

== Personal life ==
Debrot moved to Paris in 1928, and worked as a ghostwriter. He met Estelle Reed, an American singer, and married her. Estelle translated Mijn zuster de negerin and some of his short stories.

Debrot suffered from depression and physical ailments before dying of prostate cancer in December 1981. He was cremated in Driehuis and his ashes spread over the North Sea.

== Cola Debrot Prize ==
In 1968, the Government of Curaçao decided to institute a yearly cultural award. The award was named after Cola Debrot. The annual prize can be awarded for either music, literature or science.

== Cola Debrot Lectures ==
In 2008, the Werkgroep Caraïbische Letteren, an independent group within the Maatschappij der Nederlandse Letterkunde, which aims to promote and assist Caribbean literature, initiated the annual Cola Debrot lectures in Amsterdam. The first lecture was given by the Nobel Prize winning author Derek Walcott.

== Works cited ==
=== Journals ===
- "Back Matter". Callaloo. 21 (3). Johns Hopkins University: 714–724. 1998. doi:10.2307/3299663. JSTOR 3299663.

=== Web ===
- "Cola Debrot". Literatuurmuseum. Archived from the original on 28 July 2017.
