= University of Curaçao =

State university of Curaçao

- Universiteit van Curaçao; Universidat di Kòrsòu
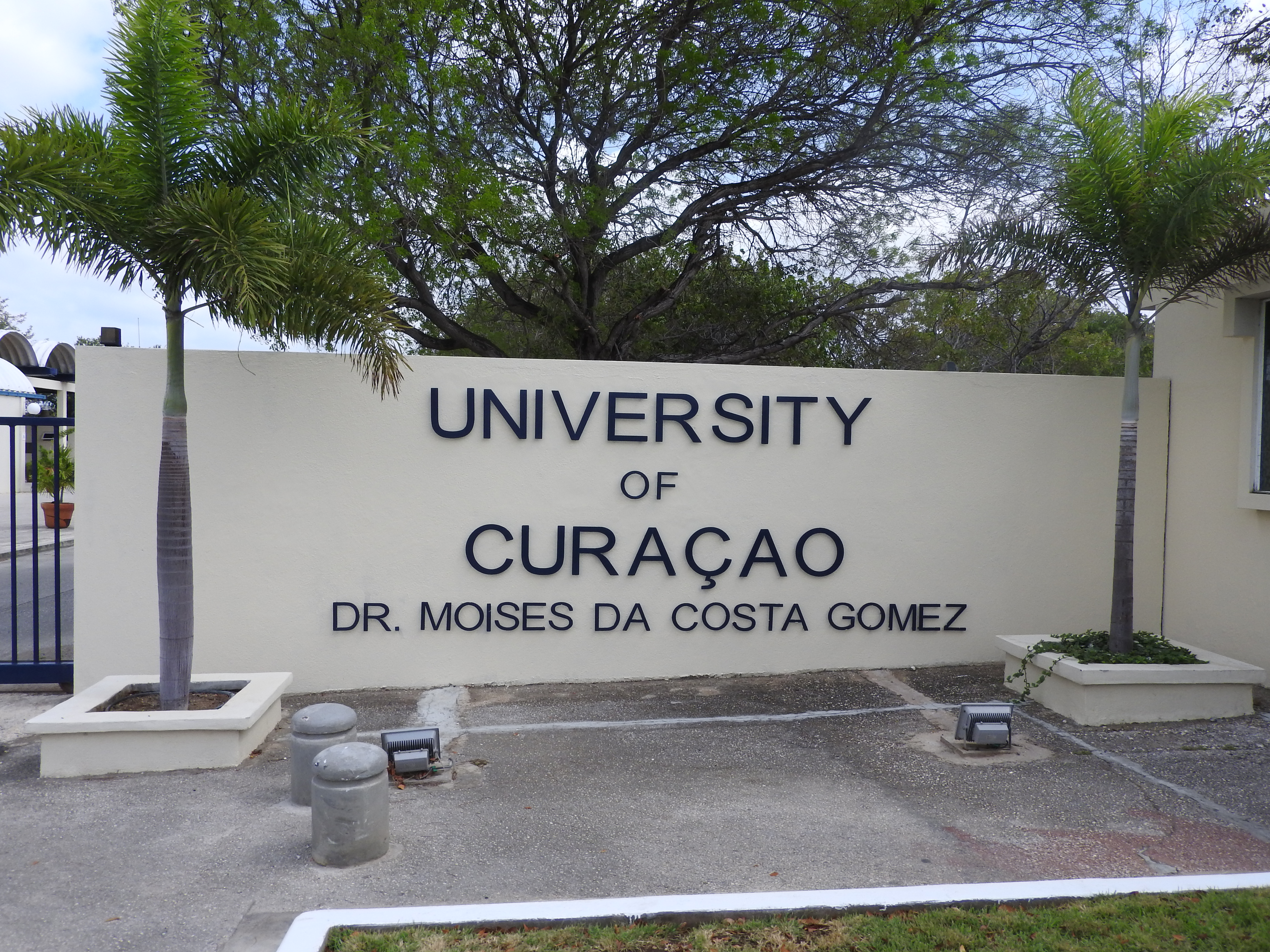
- Former names: University of the Netherlands Antilles, Antillean College of Technology, College of the Netherlands Antilles, College of Law
- Motto: Pursuing excellence in values, knowledge, and skills
- Type: Public
- Established: 1979
- Endowment: ANG20 million
- Rector: Stella van Rijn
- Faculty: 40
- Administrative staff: 60
- Undergraduates: 1500
- Postgraduates: 70
- Location: Willemstad, Curaçao; 12.157°N 68.961°W
- Website: www.uoc.cw

The Dr. Moises Frumencio da Costa Gomez University of Curaçao, formerly University of The Netherlands Antilles (UNA; Dutch: Universiteit van de Nederlandse Antillen), is the state university of Curaçao. It is a public university, graduating approximately three hundred students per year. The quality and level of the program are similar to those in the Netherlands. All programs provided at the university are accredited by The Nederlands-Vlaamse Accreditatieorganisatie (NVAO).

== History ==
The University of Curaçao has existed in its present form since 1979. In 1970, however, the Law College of the Netherlands Antilles was established there to prepare students to take the LL.B. Antillean Law exam. The Law College became the College of the Netherlands Antilles in 1974, after a degree program in Business Administration was established. The Department of Business Administration was changed into the Department of Business Administration and Public Administration in 1977, after which students could also obtain a bachelor's degree in Public Administration. Finally, with the foundation of the UNA in 1979 by a national decree dated 12 January 1979 (O.B. 1979 no. 12), the Antillean College of Technology (established 1972), was transformed into the Faculty of Engineering.

In 2011 the University of the Netherlands Antilles was renamed the University of Curaçao mr. dr. Moises Frumencio da Costa Gomez.

== Notable alumni ==
- Mike Eman (Former Prime Minister of Aruba)
- Diana Lebacs writer and knight in the Order of Orange-Nassau
- René Römer (CEO Curaçao International Financial Center and Dutch Caribbean Securities Exchange N.V.)

== Notable faculty ==
=== Former faculty ===
- Frank Martinus Arion, writer
- Rutsel Martha, minister of Justice and diplomat
