= Governor of the Netherlands Antilles =

- Flag of the governor

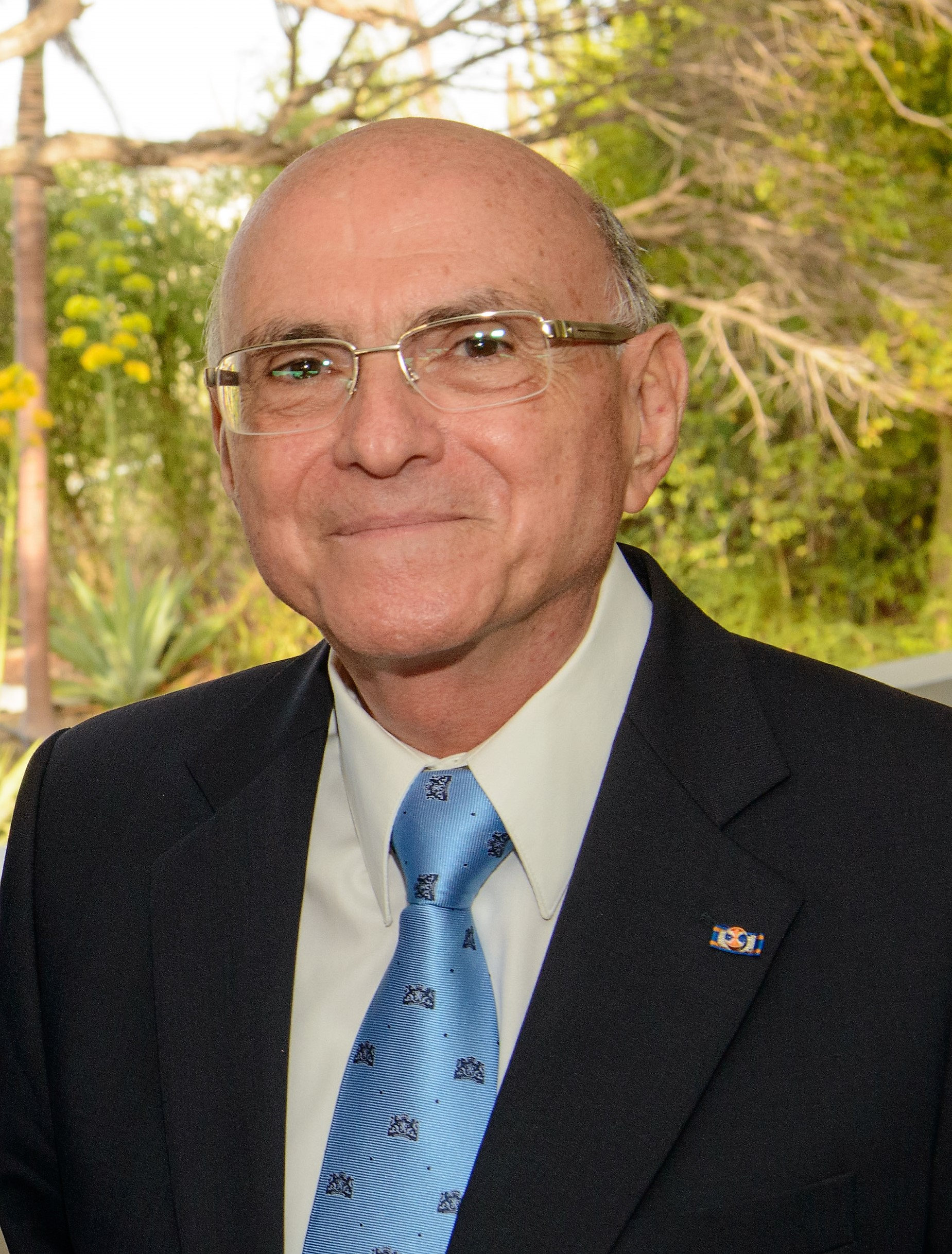
- Longest serving Jaime Saleh; 16 January 1990 – 1 July 2002
- Residence: Fort Amsterdam
- Appointer: Dutch monarch
- Formation: 1845
- First holder: Teun Struycken
- Final holder: Frits Goedgedrag
- Abolished: 10 October 2010

The governor of the Netherlands Antilles was the representative of the Kingdom of the Netherlands in the Netherlands Antilles and the head of government of the Netherlands Antilles.

== Duties ==
With the introduction of the Charter for the Kingdom of the Netherlands in 1954, the powers, obligations and responsibilities of the governor as an organ of the Kingdom of the Netherlands were regulated in the Regulations for the Governor; Article 15, paragraph 1 reads:

The Governor represents the Government of the Kingdom and guards the general interest of the Kingdom in accordance with the provisions and regulations and with due observance of changes to be indicated by or pursuant to Royal Decrees. He was accountable to the Government of the Kingdom.

The governor is therefore authorized, within the limits of these regulations and the instruction of the Crown, to act on behalf of the government of the Kingdom of the Netherlands.

According to the Constitution, the governor, as a representative of the monarch, was the head of the government of the Netherlands Antilles. As the head of the government, the governor was immune. The governor exercised executive power under the responsibility of the ministers, who are responsible to the Parliament of the Netherlands Antilles.

=== Dissolution ===
On 10 October 2010 the Netherlands Antilles was dissolved. With the dissolution of the Antilles, Curaçao and Sint Maarten became constituent countries within the Kingdom of the Netherlands, while Bonaire, Sint Eustatius and Saba became special municipalities of the Netherlands. Each constituent country within the kingdom has its own governor. Bonaire, Sint Eustatius and Saba are represented by a gezaghebber.

== List of governors ==
=== Curaçao and Dependencies (1845–1954) ===
Before the introduction of the Charter for the Kingdom of the Netherlands in 1954, the Dutch Antilles was called Curaçao and Dependencies.

No.	Portrait	Name	Term of office
1		Rutgers Hermanus Esser	1845–1848
2		Isaäc Johannes Rammelman Elsevier	1848–1854
3		Jacob Bennebroek Gravenhorst	1854–1856
4		Reinhart Frans van Lansberge	1856–1859
5		Johannes Didericus Crol	1859–1866
6		Abraham Matthieu de Rouville	1866–1870
7		Herman François Gerardus Wagner	1871–1877
8		Hendrik Bernardus Kip	1877–1880
9		Johannes Herbert August Willem van Heerdt tot Eversberg	1880–1882
10		Nicolaas van den Brandhof	1882–1890
11		Charles Augustine Henry Barge	1890–1901
–		Theodorus Isaak Andreas Nuyens	1901
12		Jan Olphert de Jong van Beek en Donk	1901–1909
–		John Brown Gorsira	1909
13		Theodorus Isaak Andreas Nuyens	1909–1919
14		Oscar Louis Helfrich	1919–1921
–		John Brown Gorsira	1921
15		Nicolaas Johannes Laurentius Brantjes	1921–1928
–		Marius van Dijk	1928–1929
–		Leonard Albert Fruytier	1929
16		Herman Bernard Cornelis Schotborgh	1929–1930
17		Bartholomaeus Wouther Theodorus van Slobbe	1930–1936
–		Frans Adriaan Jas	1936
18		Gielliam Johannes Josephus Wouters	1936–1942
19		Petrus Albertus Kasteel	1942–1948
–		Cornelius Süthoff	1948
20		Leonard Antoon Hubert Peters	1948–1951
21		Antoon Arnold Marie Struycken	1951–1954

=== Netherlands Antilles (1954–2010) ===
Following the introduction of the charter, the governor position was officiated in the Constitution of the Netherlands Antilles.

No.	Portrait	Name	Term of office
1		Antoon Arnold Marie Struycken	1954–1956
–		Frank van der Valk	1956–1957
2		Antonius Speekenbrink	1957–1961
–		Christiaan Winkel	1961–1962
–		Aldert van Bruggen	1962
3		Nicolaas Debrot	1962–1970
4		Bernadito M. Leito	1970–1983
5		René Antonio Römer	1983–1990
6		Jaime Mercelino Saleh	1990–2002
7		Frits Martinus de los Santos Goedgedrag	2002–2010

== Gubernatorial standards ==
1966–1986

1986–2010

== See also ==
- Prime Minister of the Netherlands Antilles
- Constitution of the Netherlands Antilles
