= Curaçao =

Island country within the Kingdom of the Netherlands

Curaçao Kòrsou (Papiamento)
- Constituent country in the Kingdom of the Netherlands
- Country of Curaçao; Pais Kòrsou (Papiamento); Land Curaçao (Dutch)
- Flag Coat of arms
- Anthem: Himno di Kòrsou (Papiamento) (English: "Anthem of Curaçao")
- Royal anthem: Wilhelmus (Dutch)
- Location of Curaçao (circled in red)
- Sovereign state: Kingdom of the Netherlands
- Country status: 10 October 2010
- Capital and largest city: Willemstad; 12°6′18″N 68°56′6″W
- Official languages: Papiamento; Dutch; English
- Ethnic groups (2018): 75.4% Curaçaoans; 9% Dutch; 3.6% Dominican; 3% Colombian; 1.2% Haitian; 1.2% Surinamese; 1.1% Venezuelan; 1.1% Aruban; 0.9% unspecified; 6% other
- Religion: 90% Christianity; 73% Catholic; 18.5% total Protestant; 6.6% Pentecostal; 3.2% Protestant; 3% Seventh-day Adventist; 3.2% Evangelical; 0.8% Jehovah's Witnesses; 1.7% Other Christian; 6% No religion; 2% Hinduism; 0.5% Islam; 0.2% Judaism; 0.8% Other; 0.6% Not stated
- Demonym(s): Curaçaoan; Dutch
- Government: Parliamentary representative democracy within a constitutional monarchy
  - Monarch: Willem-Alexander
  - Governor: Mauritsz de Kort
  - Speaker: Fergino Brownbill
  - Prime Minister: Gilmar Pisas
- Legislature: Parliament of Curaçao

Area
  - Total: 444 km^{2} (171 sq mi) (181st)
- Highest elevation: 372 m (1,220 ft)

Population
  - 2023 census: 155,826
  - Density: 349.13/km^{2} (904.2/sq mi)
- GDP (PPP): 2021 estimate
  - Total: $5.5 billion (184th)
  - Per capita: $35,484 (45th)
- GDP (nominal): 2024 estimate
  - Total: $3.5 billion
  - Per capita: $22,761
- HDI (2012): 0.811 very high
- Currency: Caribbean guilder (XCG)
- Time zone: UTC−4:00 (AST)
- Driving side: Right
- Calling code: +599 9
- ISO 3166 code: CW; NL-CW; CUW
- Internet TLD: .cw

Curaçao, (Note: English: /ˈkjʊərəsoʊ, -saʊ, ˌkjʊərəˈsoʊ, -ˈsaʊ/ KURE-ə-soh, KURE-ə-sow, kure-ə-SOH, kure-ə-SOW; Dutch: [kyrɑˈsʌu]; Papiamento: Kòrsou [ˈkɔrsɔu̯].) officially the Country of Curaçao, (Note: Dutch: Land Curaçao; Papiamento: Pais Kòrsou.) is a constituent country within the Kingdom of the Netherlands. It is an island country located in the southern Caribbean Sea, specifically the Dutch Caribbean region, about 65 km (40 mi) north of Venezuela and 80 km (50 mi) southeast of Aruba. Curaçao includes the main island of Curaçao, and the much smaller, uninhabited island of Klein Curaçao ("Little Curaçao").

The 2023 census recorded a population of nearly 156,000 people in Curaçao. The country has an area of 444 km^{2} (171 sq mi); its capital is Willemstad. Together with Aruba and Bonaire, Curaçao forms part of the ABC islands. Collectively, Curaçao, Aruba, and other Dutch islands in the Caribbean are often called the Dutch Caribbean. It is the largest of the ABC islands in terms of both area and population.

The island is known for its indigenous bitter orange-based liqueur, Curaçao, flavoured with the dried peel of the laraha, a citrus fruit grown on the island.

Curaçao was originally inhabited by the Arawak and Caquetío Indigenous Peoples. The first Europeans to explore the island were Spanish, who first reached it in 1499. The island became a Spanish colony after Alonso de Ojeda's 1499 expedition. Though labelled "the Useless Island" due to its poor agricultural yield and lack of precious metals, it later became a strategic cattle ranching area. When the Dutch colonized the island in 1634, they shifted the island's focus to trade and shipping, and later made it a hub of the Atlantic slave trade.

British forces occupied Curaçao twice during the French Revolutionary and Napoleonic Wars, but it was returned to Dutch rule. The abolition of slavery in 1863 led to economic shifts and migrations. Dutch remains the official language, though Papiamento, English, and Spanish are widely spoken, reflecting the island's diverse cultural influences. Curaçao was part of the Curaçao and Dependencies colony from 1815 to 1954, and part of the Netherlands Antilles from 1954 until 2010, as Island Territory of Curaçao. (Note: Dutch: Eilandgebied Curaçao; Papiamento: Teritorio Insular di Kòrsou.) (Note: The English name is used by the governments of Curaçao and Netherlands Antilles, as English was an official language of the Netherlands Antilles and the Island Territory of Curaçao.)

The discovery of oil in the Maracaibo Basin in 1914 transformed Curaçao into a major refinery location, altering its economic landscape. There were efforts towards becoming a country within the Kingdom of the Netherlands; the island achieved autonomy in 2010.

== Etymology ==
From 1525, the island was featured on Spanish maps as Curaçote, Curasaote and Curasaore. By the 17th century, it appeared on most maps as Curaçao or Curazao. On a map created by Hieronymus Cock in 1562 in Antwerp, the island was called Qúracao.

One explanation for the island's name is that Curaçao was the autonym by which its Indigenous peoples identified themselves. Early Spanish accounts support this theory, referring to the Indigenous peoples as Indios Curaçaos.

Another theory claims that in the 16th and 17th centuries—the early years of European exploration—when sailors on long voyages got scurvy from lack of vitamin C, sick Portuguese or Spanish sailors were left on the island. When their ship returned, some had recovered, probably after eating vitamin C-rich fruit there. From then on, the Portuguese allegedly referred to the island as Ilha de Curação 'island of healing' or the Spanish as Isla de la Curación.

== History ==
=== Pre-colonial ===
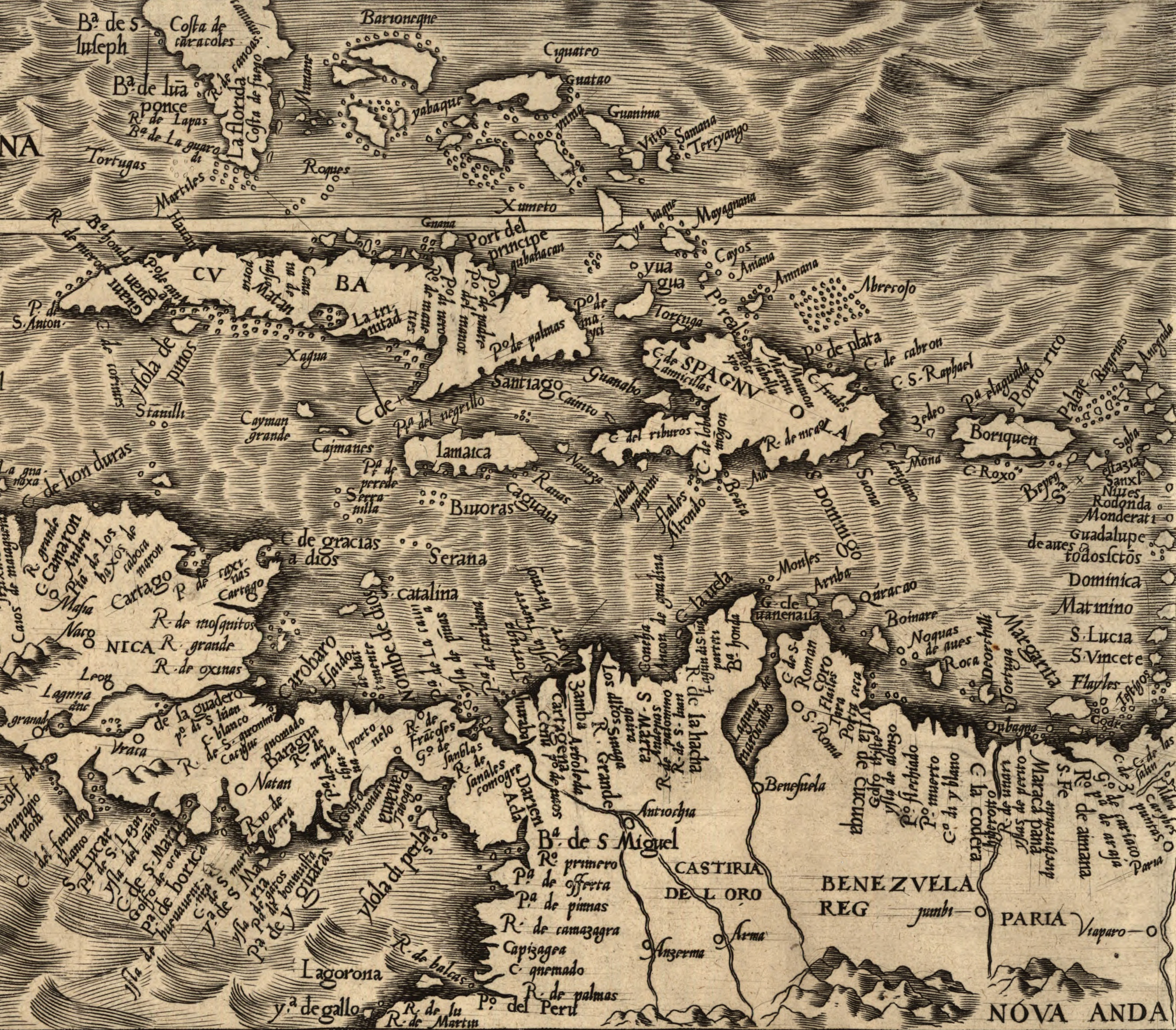
Map from 1562 with Curaçao indicated as Qúracao

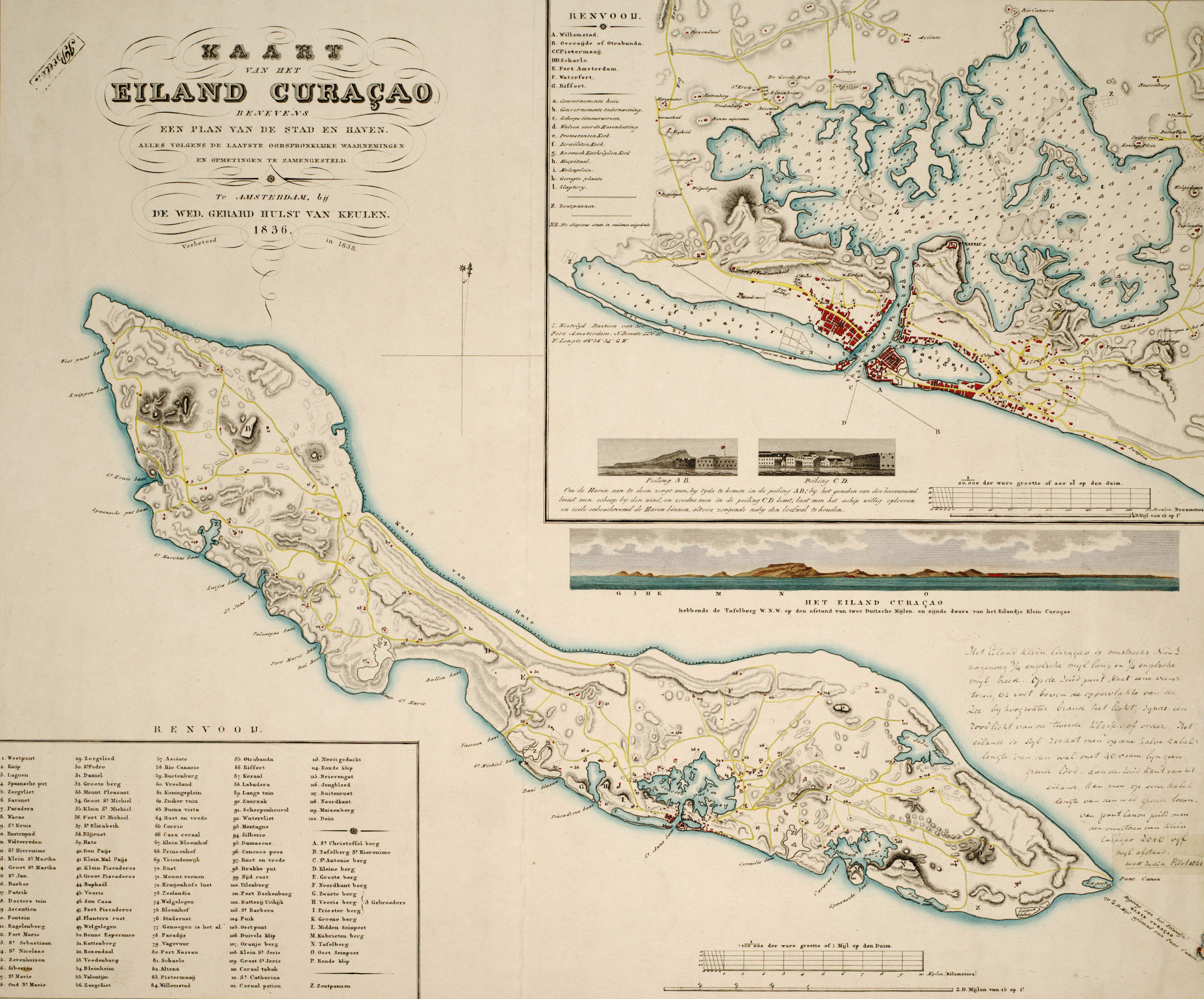
Map of Curaçao in 1836

The original inhabitants of Curaçao were the Arawak and Caquetio Amerindians. Their ancestors had migrated to the island from the mainland of Venezuela, South America, around 3700 BCE to 1500 BCE, probably hundreds of years before Europeans' first arrival.

=== Spanish colonization ===
The first Europeans recorded as seeing the island were members of a Spanish expedition under the leadership of Alonso de Ojeda in 1499.

Established in 1499 as a Spanish launchpad for exploring northern South America, Curaçao was officially settled by Spain in 1527. It functioned as an island extension of Venezuela throughout the 1500s. As mainland colonization advanced, Spain slowly withdrew from the island. The city registry of Caracas, Venezuela, holds one of the earliest written mentions of Curaçao. A document dated 9 December 1595, states that Francisco Montesinos, priest and vicar of "the Yslas de Curasao, Aruba and Bonaire" conferred his power of attorney to Pedro Gutiérrez de Lugo, a Caracas resident, to collect his ecclesiastic salary from the Royal Treasury of King Philip II of Spain.

The Spanish introduced numerous tree, plant and animal species to Curaçao, including horses, sheep, goats, pigs and cattle from Europe and other Spanish colonies. In general, imported sheep, goats and cattle did relatively well. Cattle were herded by Caquetios and Spaniards and roamed freely in the kunuku plantations and savannahs.

Not all imported species fared equally well, and the Spanish also learned to use Caquetio crops and agricultural methods, as well as those from other Caribbean islands. Though historical sources point to thousands of people living on the island, agricultural yields were disappointing; this and the lack of precious metals in the salt mines led the Spanish to call Curaçao "the useless island".

Over time, the number of Spaniards living on Curaçao decreased while the number of aboriginal inhabitants stabilized. Presumably through natural growth, return and colonization, the Caquetio population then began to increase. In the last decades of Spanish occupation, Curaçao was used as a large cattle ranch. At that point, Spaniards lived around Santa Barbara, Santa Ana and in the villages in the western part of the island, while the Caquetios are thought to have lived scattered all over the island.

=== Dutch colonial rule ===
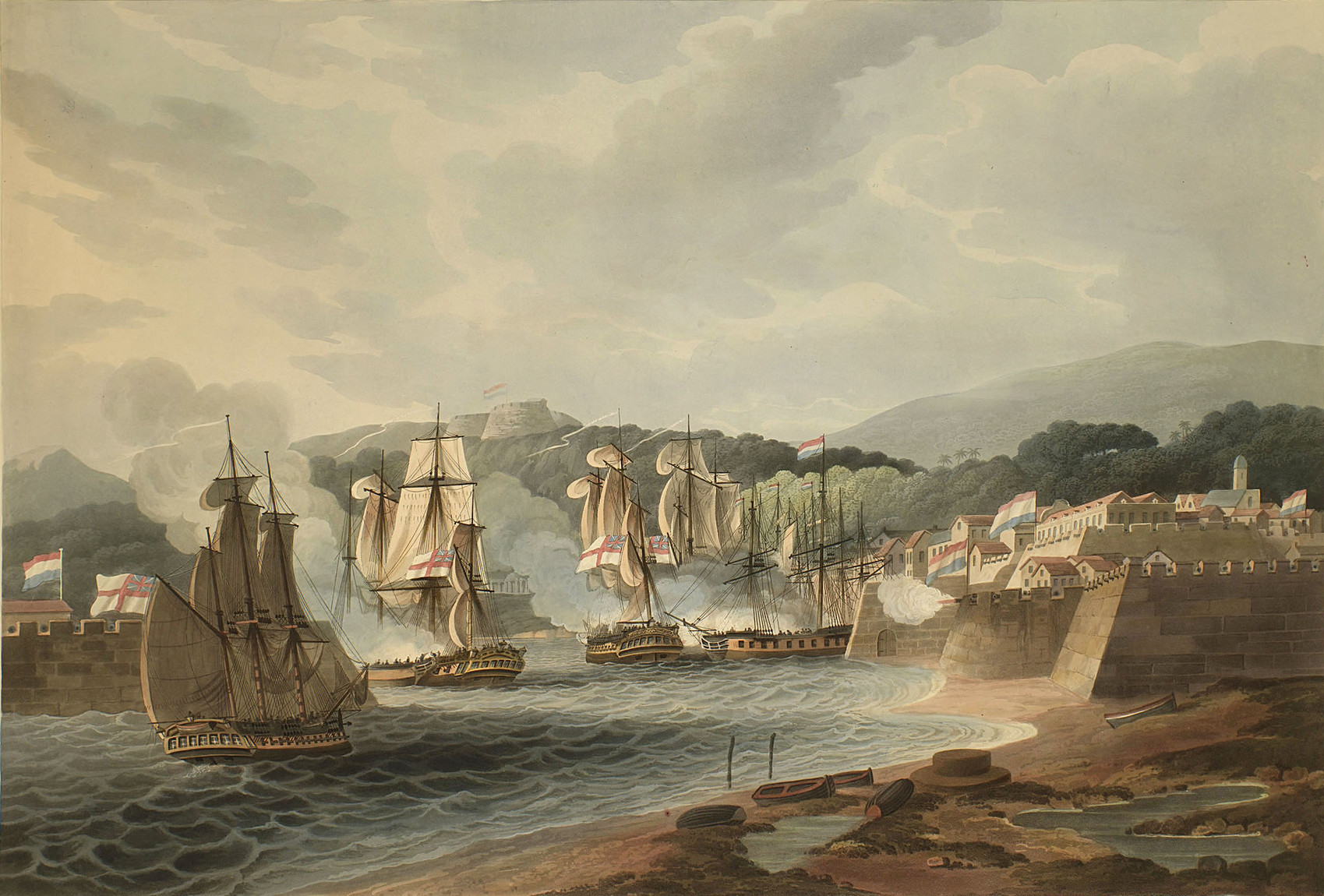
Royal Navy warships under Charles Brisbane capturing Curaçao on 1 January 1807

In 1634, during the Eighty Years' War of independence between the Republic of the Netherlands and Spain, the Dutch West India Company under Admiral Johann van Walbeeck invaded the island; the Spanish surrendered in San Juan in August. Approximately 30 Spaniards and many indigenous people were then deported to Santa Ana de Coro in Venezuela. About 30 Taíno families were allowed to live on the island while Dutch colonists started settling there.

The Dutch West India Company founded the capital of Willemstad in 1634 on the banks of an inlet called the Schottegat; the natural harbour proved an ideal place for trade. Commerce and shipping—and piracy—became Curaçao's most important economic activities. Later, salt mining became a major industry, the mineral being a lucrative export at the time. From 1662, the Dutch West India Company made Curaçao a centre of the Atlantic slave trade, often bringing slaves from West Africa to the island, before selling them elsewhere in the Caribbean and Spanish Main.

Sephardic Jews fleeing persecution in Spain and Portugal sought safe haven in Dutch Brazil and the Dutch Republic. Many settled in Curaçao, where through the centuries the Jews of Curaçao flourished in trade, shipping, commerce and banking, and left their mark on practically all facets of life on the island. By the end of the eighteenth century the Jews constituted more than half of the white population in Curaçao. In 1674 the island became a free port.

In the Franco-Dutch War of 1672–1678, French Admiral Jean II d'Estrées planned to attack Curaçao. His fleet—12 men-of-war, three fire ships, two transports, a hospital ship, and 12 privateers—met with disaster, losing seven men-of-war and two other ships when they struck reefs off the Las Aves archipelago. The serious navigational error occurred on 11 May 1678, a week after the fleet set sail from Saint Kitts.

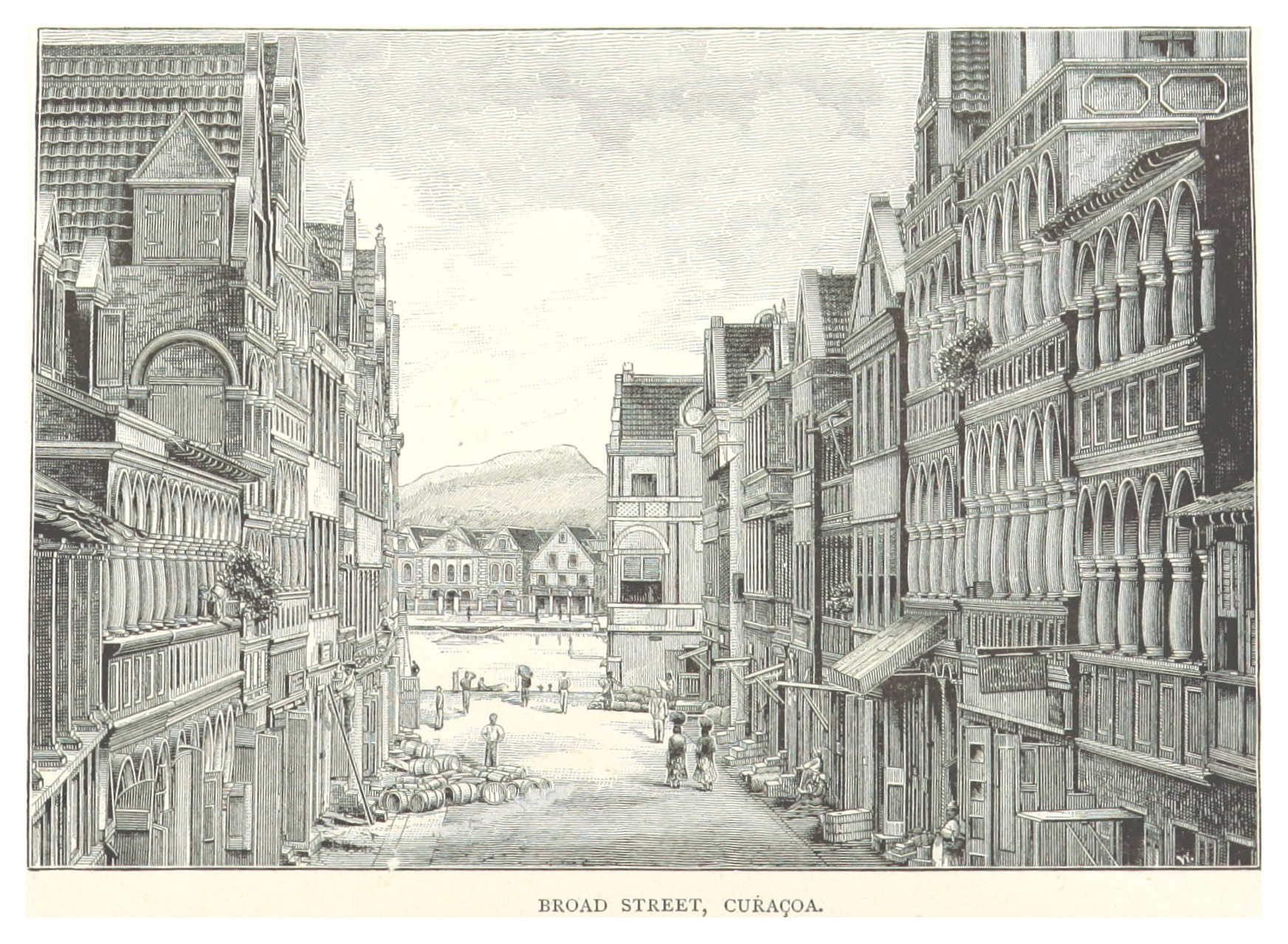
Willemstad, 1885

In 1795, a major slave revolt took place under the leaders Tula Rigaud, Louis Mercier, Bastian Karpata, and Pedro Wakao. Up to 4,000 slaves in northwest Curaçao revolted, with more than 1,000 taking part in extended gunfights. After a month, the slave owners were able to suppress the revolt.

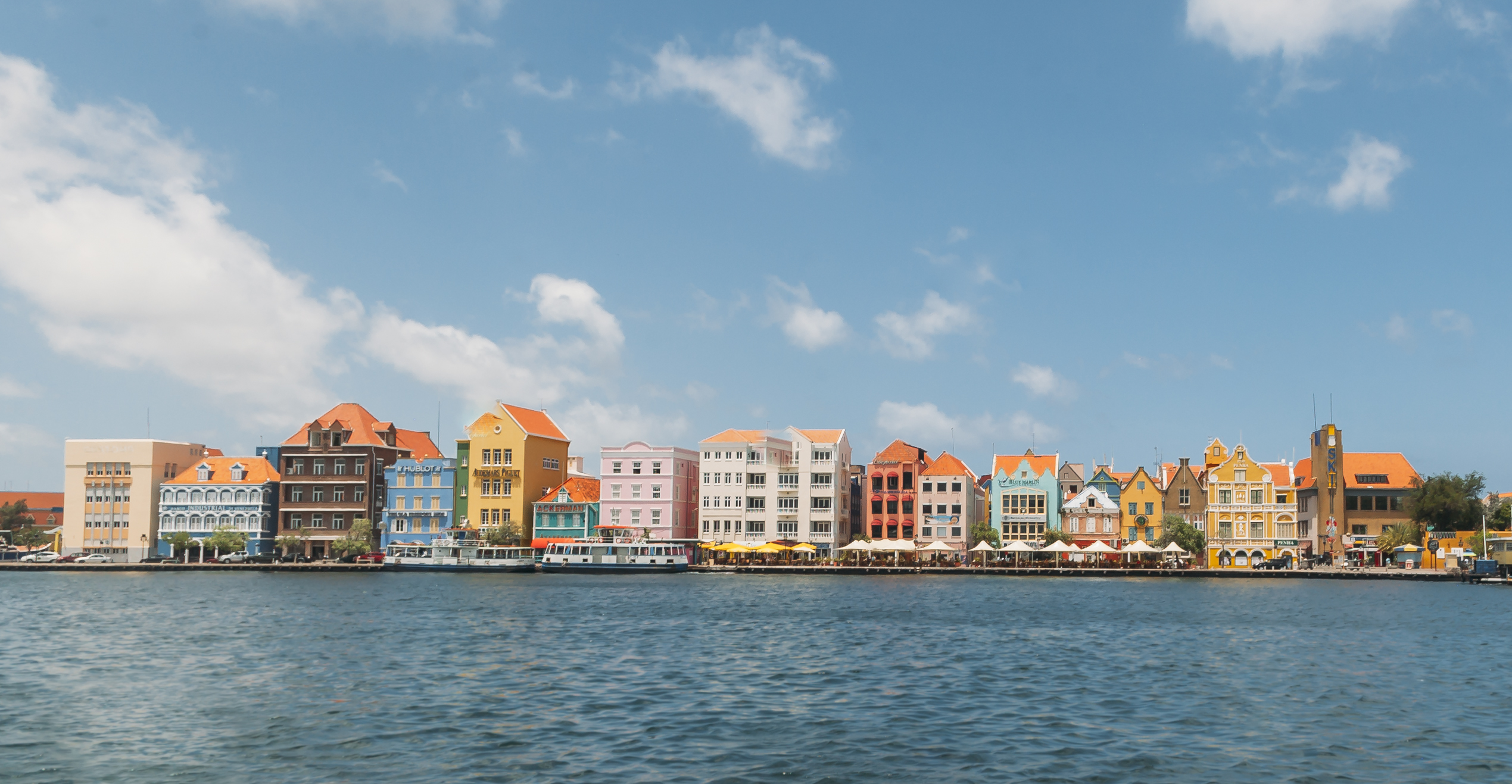
The buildings of the Handelskade in Willemstad, Curaçao

Curaçao's proximity to South America resulted in interaction with cultures of the coastal areas more than a century after the independence of the Netherlands from Spain. Architectural similarities can be seen between 19th century Willemstad neighbourhoods and the nearby Venezuelan city of Coro in Falcón State, which has also been designated a World Heritage Site. Netherlands established economic ties with the Viceroyalty of New Granada that included the present-day countries of Colombia and Venezuela. In the 19th century, Curaçaoans such as Manuel Piar and Luis Brión were prominently engaged in the wars of independence of both Venezuela and Colombia. Political refugees from the mainland, such as Simón Bolívar, regrouped in Curaçao.

During the French Revolutionary and Napoleonic Wars, British forces twice occupied Curaçao; the first occupation lasted from 1800 to 1803, and the second occupation from 1807 to 1815. At the end of the Napoleonic Wars stable Dutch rule returned in 1815. After the signing of the Treaty of London, the island was incorporated into the colony of Curaçao and Dependencies.

The Dutch abolished slavery in 1863, causing vast changes in the economy with the shift to wage labour. Some Curaçao inhabitants emigrated to other islands, such as Cuba, to work in sugarcane plantations. Other former slaves had nowhere to go and continued working for plantation owners under the tenant farmer system, (Note: Called "Paga Tera") in which former slaves leased land from former masters.

Dutch was not widely spoken on the island outside of the colonial administration, but its use increased in the late 19th and early 20th centuries. Students on Curaçao, Aruba, and Bonaire were taught predominantly in Spanish until the early 19th century, when the British occupied all three islands. Teaching of Spanish was restored when Dutch rule resumed in 1815. Also, efforts were made to introduce widespread bilingual Dutch and Papiamentu education in the late 19th century.

=== 20th and 21st centuries ===
When oil was discovered in the Venezuelan Maracaibo Basin town of Mene Grande in 1914, Curaçao's economy was dramatically altered. In the early years, both Shell and Exxon held drilling concessions in Venezuela, which ensured a constant supply of crude oil to refineries in Aruba and Curaçao. Crude oil production in Venezuela was inexpensive. Both Shell and Exxon were vertically integrated and controlled the entire industry, from pumping, transporting, and refining to sales. The refineries on Aruba and Curaçao operated in global markets and were profitable partly because of the margin between the production costs of crude oil and the revenues from the sale of oil products. This provided a safety net for losses incurred through inefficiency or excessive operating costs at the refineries.

In 1929, Curaçao was attacked by Venezuelan rebel commander Rafael Simón Urbina, who, with 250 soldiers, captured the fort. The Venezuelans plundered weapons, ammunition, and the island's treasury. They also managed to capture the Governor of the island, Leonardus Albertus Fruytier (1882–1972), and hauled him off to Venezuela on a stolen American ship, Maracaibo. Fruytier was criticized and had to resign as governor. After returning to the Netherlands, he settled for a position as chief inspector in Maastricht. The Dutch increased their military presence on the island.

In 1936 a burning bale of cotton thrown overboard by the crew of MS Colombia, which lay anchored in the Schottegat, caused the oil floating on the water to catch fire. It took days to get the fire under control; houses had to be evacuated, but there were no casualties.

During the Second World War, the island played an important role in the supply of fuel for the Allied forces. In 1940, before the invasion of the Netherlands by Germany, the British occupied Curaçao and the French Aruba. The presence of powers other than the Netherlands alarmed the Venezuelan government given the proximity of these islands at the entrance to the Gulf of Venezuela and the fact they had historically been used as bases to launch incursions against Venezuelan territory. In 1941, US troops occupied the island and built the military airport "Hato". The main purpose of this deployment was to fight against expected future attacks by Axis submarines and potentially long-distance German bomber aircraft. The United States was also concerned over the potential threat of a German invasion of the continental US launched with the aid of German settlers in South America.

In 1942 the port of Willemstad, one of the main sources of fuel for the Allied operations, was besieged by German submarines on several occasions under Operation Neuland. In August 1942, the Germans returned to Curaçao and attacked a tanker before receiving fire from a Dutch shore battery and slipping away. The United States Navy established the Fourth Fleet, which was responsible for countering enemy naval operations in the Caribbean and in the South Atlantic. The United States Army also sent aircraft and personnel to help protect the oil refineries and bolster the Venezuelan Air Force.

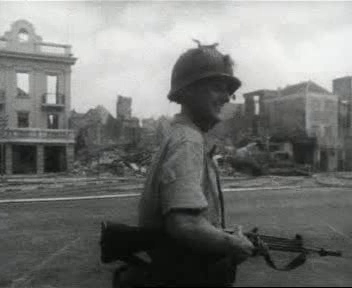
A Dutch soldier on patrol in Willemstad following the 1969 riots

In 1954, Curaçao and other Dutch Caribbean colonies were joined to form the Netherlands Antilles. Discontent with Curaçao's seemingly subordinate relationship to the Netherlands, ongoing racial discrimination, and a rise in unemployment owing to layoffs in the Shell refinery led to a series of riots in 1969. A state of emergency was declared after rioters set fire to the Willemstad downtown and the bankers mansions. Protesters had to face the Dutch Royal Navy marines dispatched from the local military base on the island, to quell the rebellion led by charismatic politicians such as Wilson "Papa" Godett and Stanley Browne. The riots resulted in two deaths, numerous injuries and severe property and infrastructural damage in Willemstad. In response, the Dutch government introduced far-reaching reforms, allowing Afro-Curaçaoans greater influence over the island's political and economic life, and increased the prominence of the local Papiamentu language.

Curaçao experienced an economic downturn in the early 1980s. Shell's refinery on the island operated with significant losses from 1975 to 1979, and again from 1982 to 1985. Persistent losses, global overproduction, stronger competition, and low market expectations threatened the refinery's future. In 1985, after 70 years, Royal Dutch Shell decided to end its activities on Curaçao. This came at a crucial moment. Curaçao's fragile economy had been stagnant for some time. Several revenue-generating sectors suffered even more during this period: tourism from Venezuela collapsed after the devaluation of the bolivar, and a slowdown in the transportation sector had deleterious effects on the Antillean Airline Company and the Curaçao Dry Dock Company.

In the mid-1980s, Shell sold its refinery for the symbolic amount of one Antillean guilder to a local government consortium. In recent years, the ageing refinery has been the subject of lawsuits alleging that its emissions, including sulphur dioxide and particulate matter, far exceed safety standards. The government consortium leases the refinery to the Venezuelan PDVSA state oil company.

Continuing economic hardship in the late 1990s and early 2000s resulted in much emigration to the Netherlands.

On 1 July 2007, Curaçao was due to become a country within the Kingdom of the Netherlands, like Aruba and the Netherlands Antilles. On 28 November 2006, the change was delayed when the island council rejected a clarification memorandum on the process. A new island council ratified this agreement on 9 July 2007. On 15 December 2008, Curaçao was again scheduled to become a separate country within the Kingdom of the Netherlands. A non-binding referendum on the move was held in Curaçao on 15 May 2009; 52% of voters supported it.

==== Since the dissolution of the Netherlands Antilles ====
The dissolution of the Netherlands Antilles came into effect on 10 October 2010. Curaçao became a country within the Kingdom of the Netherlands, with the kingdom retaining responsibility for defence and foreign policy. The kingdom was also tasked with overseeing the island's finances under a debt-relief arrangement agreed upon between the two. Curaçao's first prime minister was Gerrit Schotte. He was succeeded in 2012 by Stanley Betrian, ad interim. After the 2012 elections, Daniel Hodge became the third prime minister on 31 December 2012. He led a demissionary cabinet until 7 June 2013, when a new cabinet under the leadership of Ivar Asjes was sworn in.

Although Curaçao is autonomous, the Netherlands has intervened in its affairs to ensure that parliamentary elections are held and to assist in finalizing accurate budgets. In July 2017, Curaçaoan Prime Minister Eugene Rhuggenaath said he wanted Curaçao to take full responsibility over its affairs, but asked for more cooperation and assistance from the Netherlands, with suggestions for more innovative approaches to help Curaçao succeed and increase its standard of living. The Dutch government reminded the Curaçaoan government that it had provided assistance with oil refinery negotiations with the Chinese "on numerous occasions".

The 2020 COVID-19 pandemic resulted in austerity measures. Curaçao had to impose spending cuts to qualify for additional aid from the Netherlands. As part of the austerity package, the Government of Curaçao announced a 12.5% cut in benefits for civil servants. On 24 June 2020, a group of civil servants, together with waste collectors from Selikor, marched to Fort Amsterdam and demanded to speak with Rhuggenaath. The demonstration turned into a riot, and police cleared the square in front of Fort Amsterdam with tear gas. The city centre of Willemstad was later looted. 48 people were arrested, the city districts of Punda and Otrobanda were placed under lockdown for the night, and a general curfew was declared from 20:30 to 06:00.

Curaçao made its debut at the 2026 FIFA World Cup. It remains the smallest nation by both population and area to ever reach the football tournament, tying with Ecuador 0-0, and losing to Ivory Coast 0-2 and Germany 7-1.

== Geography ==
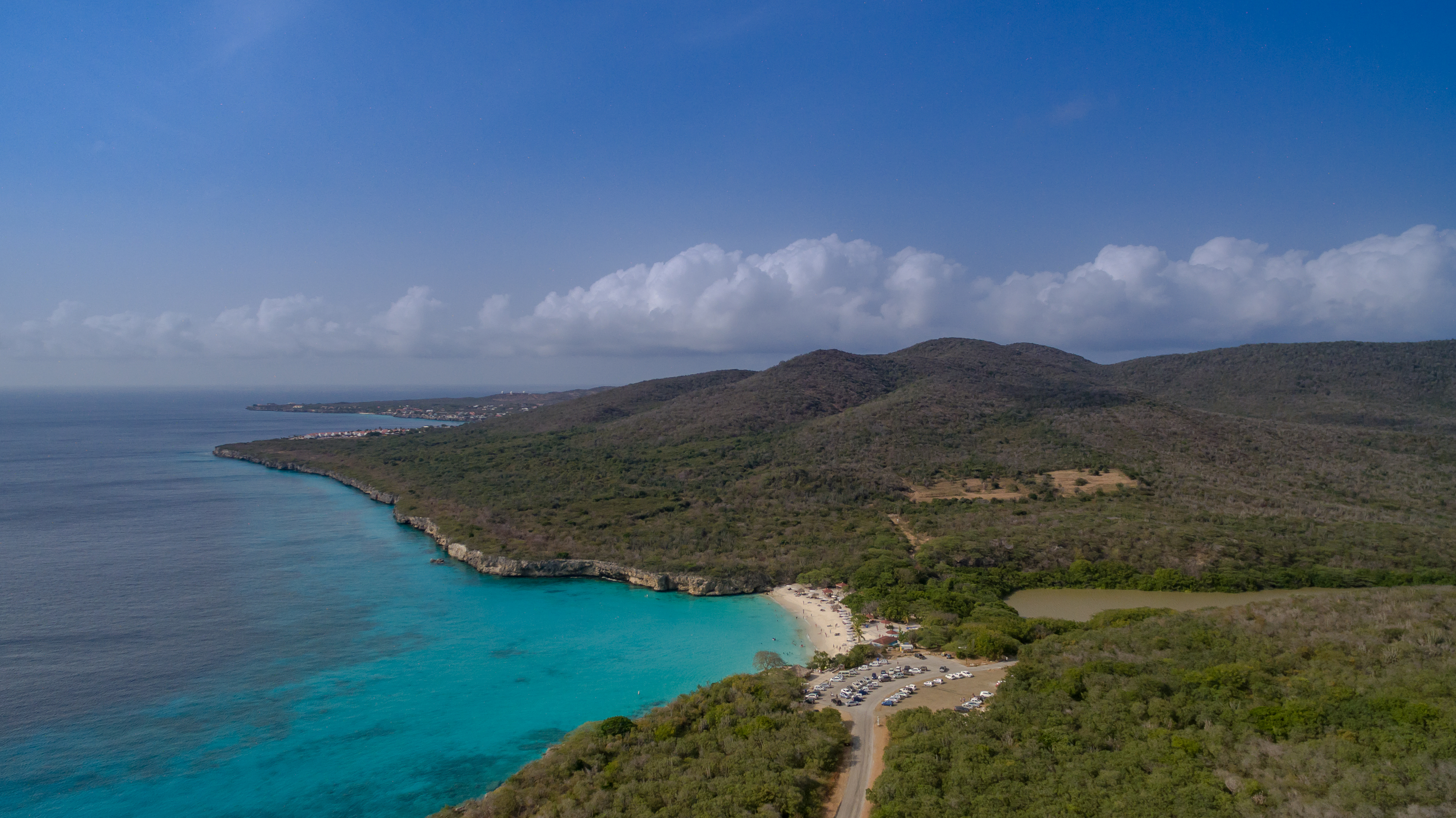
Aerial view of the coast of Curaçao

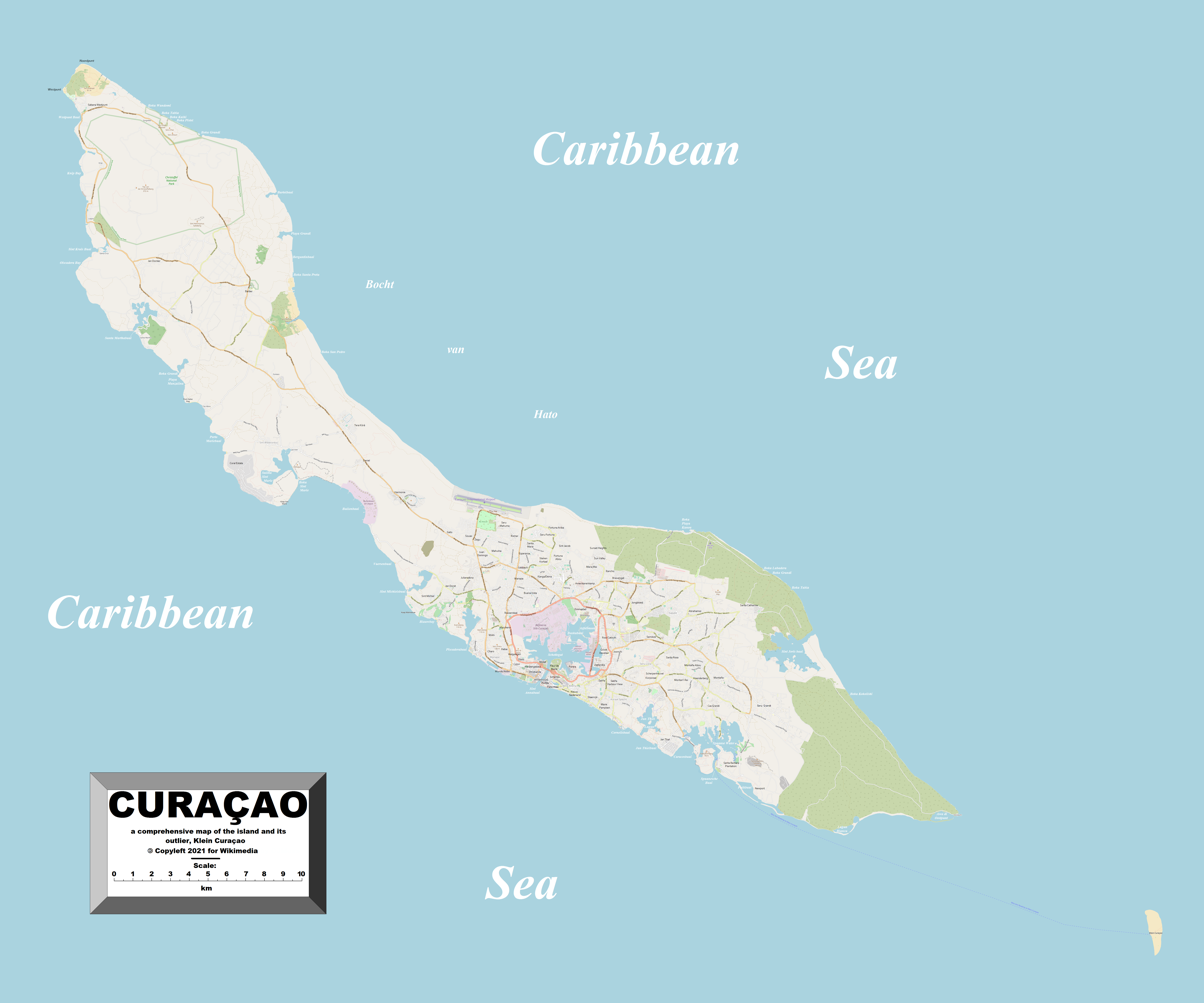
Enlargeable, detailed map of Curaçao

Curaçao lies on the continental shelf of South America and features a hilly topography with its highest point, named Christoffelberg, reaching 372 m (1,220 ft) above sea level. Curaçao has a diverse range of beaches from its coastline's bays, inlets, lagoons, seasonal lakes, rough seas at its northshore, and spring water. In addition, Curaçao has upwelling, which is an oceanographic phenomenon that involves wind-driven motion of dense, cooler and nutrient-rich water from the deep ocean moving towards the ocean surface. This is a source of natural minerals, thermal conditions, and seawater used in hydrotherapy and mesotherapy, making the island one of many balneoclimateric areas in the region. Furthermore, off the southeast coast of the main island of Curaçao lies the tiny uninhabited Isle of Klein Curaçao, which has a long stretched beach.

=== Flora ===
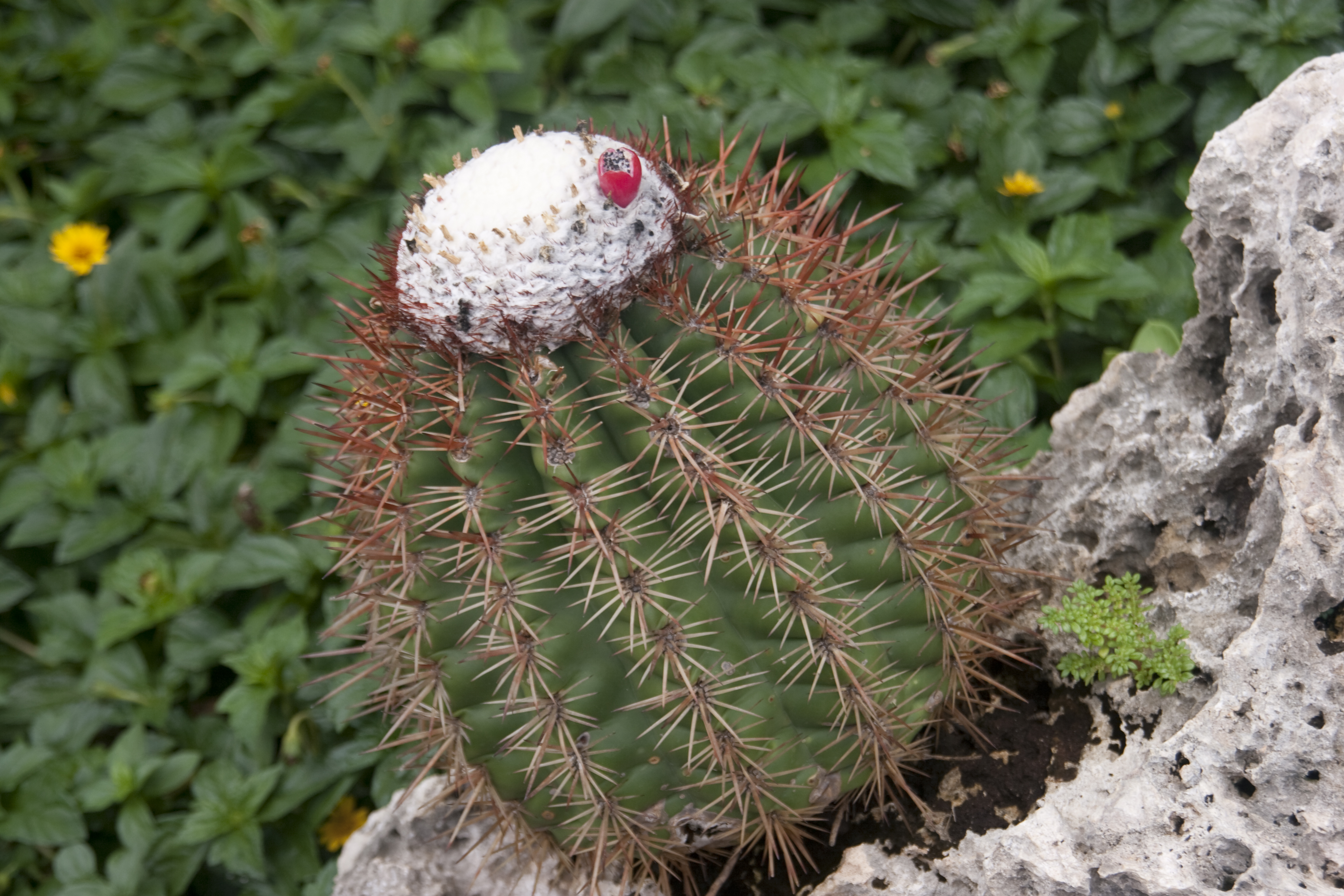
Melocactus macracanthos in Curaçao

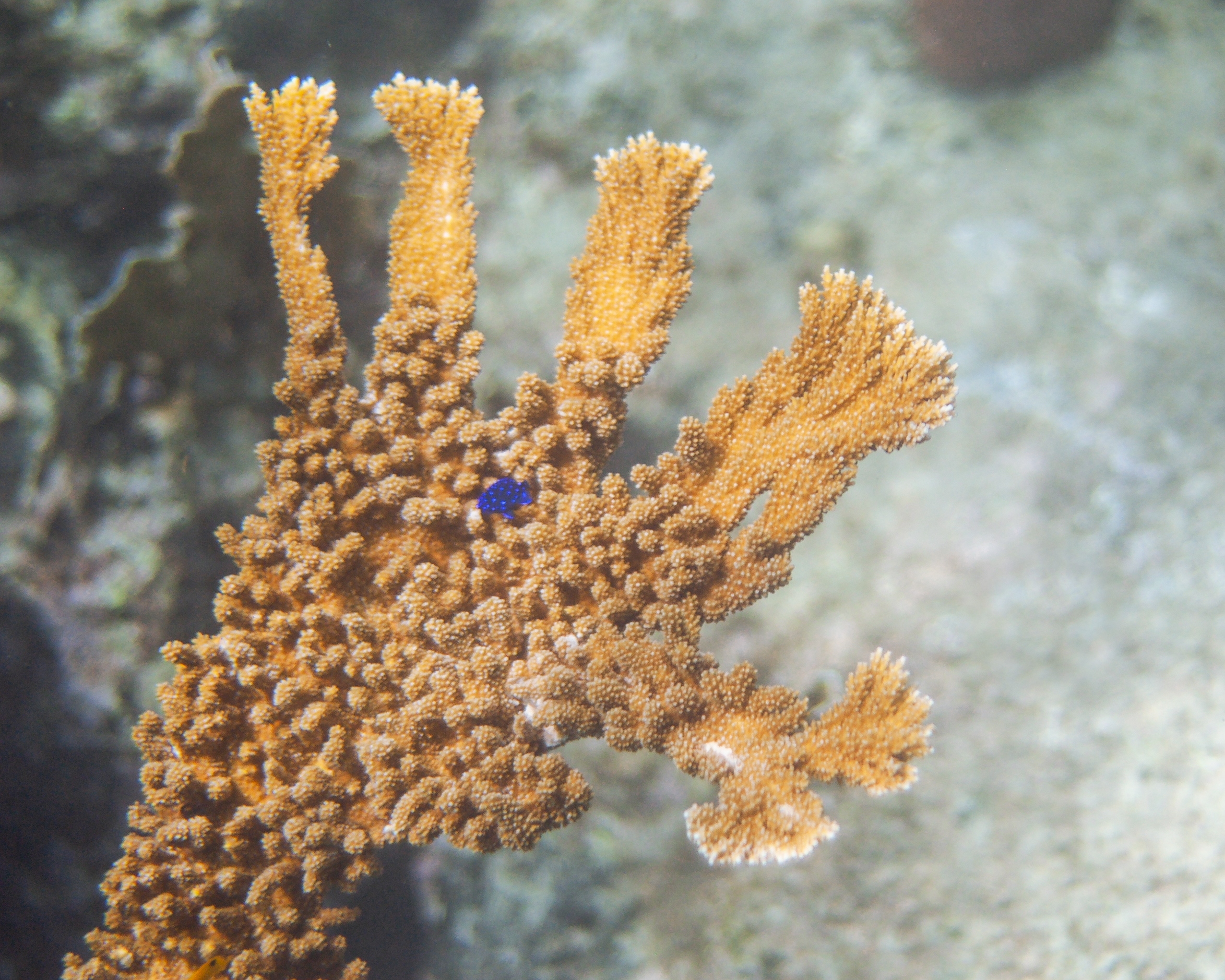
Elkhorn coral with a yellowtail damselfish (Microspathodon chrysurus) in the Caribbean Sea in Curaçao

Curaçao's flora differ from typical tropical island vegetation. The arid Guajira–Barranquilla xeric scrub ecoregion is most notably different, with various forms of cacti, thorny shrubs, evergreen, and watapana trees (Libidibia coriaria; called divi-divi on Aruba), which are characteristic of the ABC islands and the national symbol of Aruba. Brassavola nodosa is a drought-tolerant species of Brassavola, one of the few orchids present in the ABC islands.

=== Fauna ===
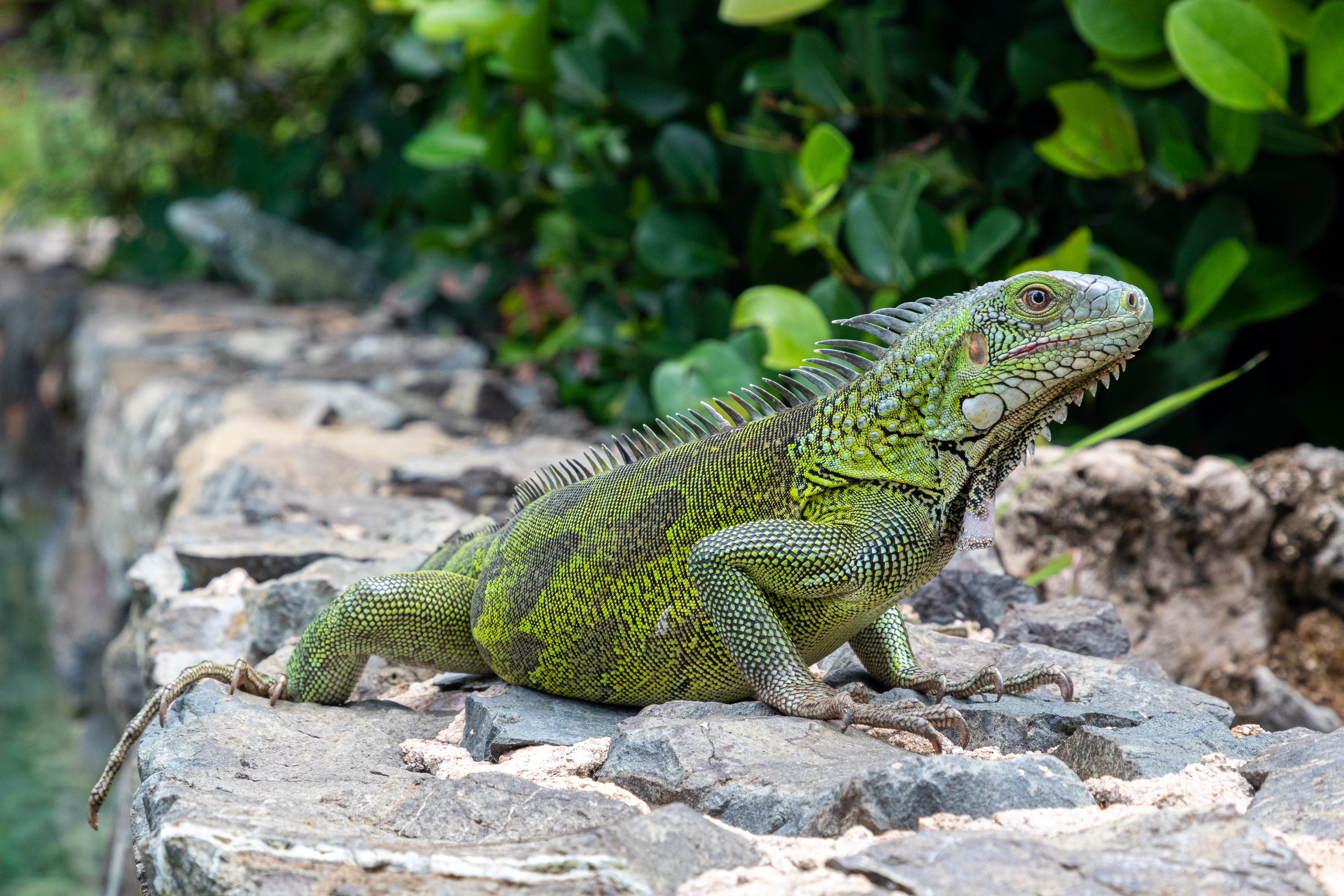
Green Iguana from Curaçao

Curaçao is semi-arid, and as such has not supported the numerous tropical species of mammals, birds, and lizards most associated with rainforests. Dozens of species of hummingbirds, bananaquits, orioles, and the larger terns, herons, egrets, and even flamingos make their homes near ponds or in coastal areas. The troupial, a black bird with a bright orange underbelly and white swatches on its wings, is common to Curaçao. The mockingbird, called chuchubi in Papiamentu, resembles the North American mockingbird, with a long white-grey tail and a grey back. Near shorelines, big billed brown pelicans feed on fish. Other seabirds include several types of gulls and large cormorants.

Other than field mice, small rabbits, and cave bats, Curaçao's most notable animal is the white-tailed deer. This deer is related to the American white-tailed deer, or Virginia deer, found in areas from North America through Central America and the Caribbean, and as far south as Bolivia. It can be a large deer, some reaching six feet (2 m) in length and three feet (0.9 m) in height and weighing as much as 300 pounds (140 kg). It has a long tail with a white underside and is the only type of deer on the island. It has been a protected species since 1926, and an estimated 200 live on Curaçao. They are found in many parts of the island, but most notably at the west end's Christoffel Park, where about 70% of the herd resides.

There are several species of iguana, light green in colour with shimmering shades of aqua along the belly and sides, found lounging in the sun across the island. The iguanas found on Curaçao serve not only as a scenic attraction but, unlike many islands that gave up the practice years ago, remain hunted for food. Along the west end of the island's north shore are several inlets that have become home to breeding sea turtles. These turtles are protected by the park system in Shete Boka Park and can be visited accompanied by park rangers.

Historically, Curaçao contained a diverse ecosystem of stygofauna, including members from relictual crustacean groups such as Thermosbaenacea. However, this network of aquatic species, involving numerous endemic taxa, have not been detected since the 1970s. Their abrupt disappearance is hypothesized to have resulted from a combination of habitat destruction and contamination of groundwater by oil and discharge, the result of oil industry activities in the late 1900s.

=== Climate ===
Curaçao has a hot, semi-arid climate (Köppen climate classification BSh) with a dry season from January to September and a wet season from October to December. Rainfall is scarce, only 450 millimetres (18 in) per year; in particular, the rainy season is drier than it normally is in tropical climates; during the dry season, it almost never rains. Owing to the scarcity of rainfall, the landscape of Curaçao is arid; especially on the north coast of the island. Temperatures are relatively constant, with small differences measured throughout the year. The trade winds cool the island during the day and warm it at night. The coolest month is January with an average temperature of 26.6 °C (80 °F); the hottest is September with an average temperature of 29.1 °C (84 °F). The year's average maximum temperature is 31.4 °C (89 °F). The year's average temperature is 25.7 °C (78 °F). The seawater around Curaçao averages around 27 °C (81 °F) and is coolest (averaging 25.9 °C or 78.6 °F) from February to March, and hottest (averaging 28.2 °C or 82.8 °F) from September to October.

Because Curaçao lies North of the Intertropical Convergence Zone and in an area of low-level divergence where winds flow parallel to the coast, its climate is much drier than expected for the northeastern side of a continent at its latitude. Rainfall is also extremely variable from year to year, being strongly linked to the El Niño Southern Oscillation. As little as 200 millimetres or 8 inches may fall in a strong El Niño year, but as much as 1,150 millimetres or 45 inches is not unknown in powerful La Niña years.

Curaçao lies outside the Main Development Region for tropical cyclones, but is still occasionally affected by them, as with Hurricanes Hazel in 1954, Anna in 1961, Felix in 2007, and Omar in 2008. No hurricane has made landfall in Curaçao since the U.S. National Hurricane Center started tracking hurricanes. Curaçao has, however, been directly affected by pre-hurricane tropical storms several times; the latest being Hurricane Tomas in 2010, Cesar in 1996, Joan in 1988, Cora and Greta in 1978, Edith and Irene in 1971, and Francelia in 1969. Tomas brushed past Curaçao as a tropical storm, dropping as much as 265 mm (10.4 in) of rain on the island, nearly half its annual precipitation in a single day. This made Tomas one of the wettest events in the island's history, as well as one of the most devastating; its flooding killed two people and caused over NAƒ50 million (US$28 million) in damage.

According to the Emissions Database for Global Atmospheric Research, average carbon dioxide emissions per person on the island were 52 tonnes in 2018, the second highest in the world.

Meteo, the Curaçao weather department, provides information about weather conditions via its website and mobile apps for iOS and Android.

Climate data for Curaçao – Hato International airport (TNCC) (1991–2020)
Month	Jan	Feb	Mar	Apr	May	Jun	Jul	Aug	Sep	Oct	Nov	Dec	Year
Record high °C (°F)	33.3 (91.9)	33.2 (91.8)	33.0 (91.4)	34.7 (94.5)	36.0 (96.8)	37.5 (99.5)	35.0 (95.0)	37.4 (99.3)	38.3 (100.9)	36.0 (96.8)	35.6 (96.1)	33.4 (92.1)	38.3 (100.9)
Mean daily maximum °C (°F)	30.0 (86.0)	30.3 (86.5)	30.7 (87.3)	31.4 (88.5)	31.9 (89.4)	32.1 (89.8)	32.2 (90.0)	32.8 (91.0)	33.0 (91.4)	32.3 (90.1)	31.2 (88.2)	30.3 (86.5)	31.5 (88.7)
Daily mean °C (°F)	26.7 (80.1)	26.8 (80.2)	27.2 (81.0)	27.8 (82.0)	28.5 (83.3)	28.7 (83.7)	28.6 (83.5)	29.1 (84.4)	29.3 (84.7)	28.8 (83.8)	28.0 (82.4)	27.3 (81.1)	28.1 (82.6)
Mean daily minimum °C (°F)	24.5 (76.1)	24.6 (76.3)	25.0 (77.0)	25.7 (78.3)	26.4 (79.5)	26.5 (79.7)	26.3 (79.3)	26.7 (80.1)	26.8 (80.2)	26.4 (79.5)	25.6 (78.1)	25.0 (77.0)	25.8 (78.4)
Record low °C (°F)	19.2 (66.6)	21.4 (70.5)	20.7 (69.3)	22.0 (71.6)	22.4 (72.3)	22.4 (72.3)	22.3 (72.1)	21.7 (71.1)	22.0 (71.6)	21.2 (70.2)	22.0 (71.6)	20.2 (68.4)	19.2 (66.6)
Average rainfall mm (inches)	49.5 (1.95)	24.5 (0.96)	17.6 (0.69)	15.8 (0.62)	15.3 (0.60)	21.8 (0.86)	36.5 (1.44)	27.7 (1.09)	43.0 (1.69)	90.9 (3.58)	141.0 (5.55)	86.4 (3.40)	570.0 (22.44)
Average rainy days (≥ 1.0 mm)	9.1	5.0	3.1	2.1	2.0	3.8	5.6	3.4	4.1	7.6	10.8	9.8	66.5
Average relative humidity (%)	78.4	76.9	76.8	77.3	77.4	76.9	77.3	76.7	76.8	78.5	80.1	79.2	77.2
Mean monthly sunshine hours	271.2	257.8	273.2	257.4	264.1	270.7	295.7	305.7	270.8	254.8	238.0	254.2	3,481.4
Percentage possible sunshine	76.1	76.4	73.0	69.2	67.1	70.3	74.7	78.8	74.1	69.3	68.6	71.6	72.4
Average ultraviolet index	10	12	12	12	12	12	12	12	12	11	10	9	11
Source: Meteorological Department Curacao and Weather Atlas (uv index)

==== Climate change ====
Average temperatures have risen sharply in the past 40 years in the Caribbean Netherlands and Curaçao has experienced more warm days and fewer cooler nights. The Intergovernmental Panel on Climate Change predicts that should air temperatures increase by 1.4 °C (2.5 °F), there will be a 5% to 6% decrease in rainfall, increased frequency and intensity of extreme weather events (including a 66% increase in hurricane intensity), and a 0.5-to-0.6-metre (1.5 to 2 ft) sea-level rise in the Caribbean Netherlands.

=== Geology ===
The northern seabed drops steeply within 60 m (200 ft) of the Curaçaoan shore. This drop-off is known as the "blue edge". On Curaçao, four major geological formations can be found: the lava formation, the Knip formation, the Mid-Curaçao formation and limestone formations.

Curaçao lies within the Caribbean large igneous province (CLIP) with key exposures of those lavas existing on the island consisting of the Curaçao Lava Formation (CLF). The CLF consists of 5 kilometres (3.1 mi) of pillow lavas with some basalt intrusions. The ages of these rocks include 89 Ma for the lavas and 75 Ma for the poikilitic sills, though some sequences may have erupted as late as 62–66 Ma, placing them in the Cretaceous period. Their composition includes picrite pillows at the base, followed by tholeiitic lavas, then hyaloclastites, then the poikilitic sills. The CLF was gradually uplifted until Eocene-Miocene limestone caps formed, before final exposure above sea level. Christoffelberg and the Zevenbergen (Seven Hills) portion of the island have exposures of the Knip Formation. This formation includes deepwater deposits of calcareous sands and fine clays, capped by siliceous chert containing radiolarians. Middle Curaçao contains alluvial soils from eroded CLF and limestone.

=== Beaches ===
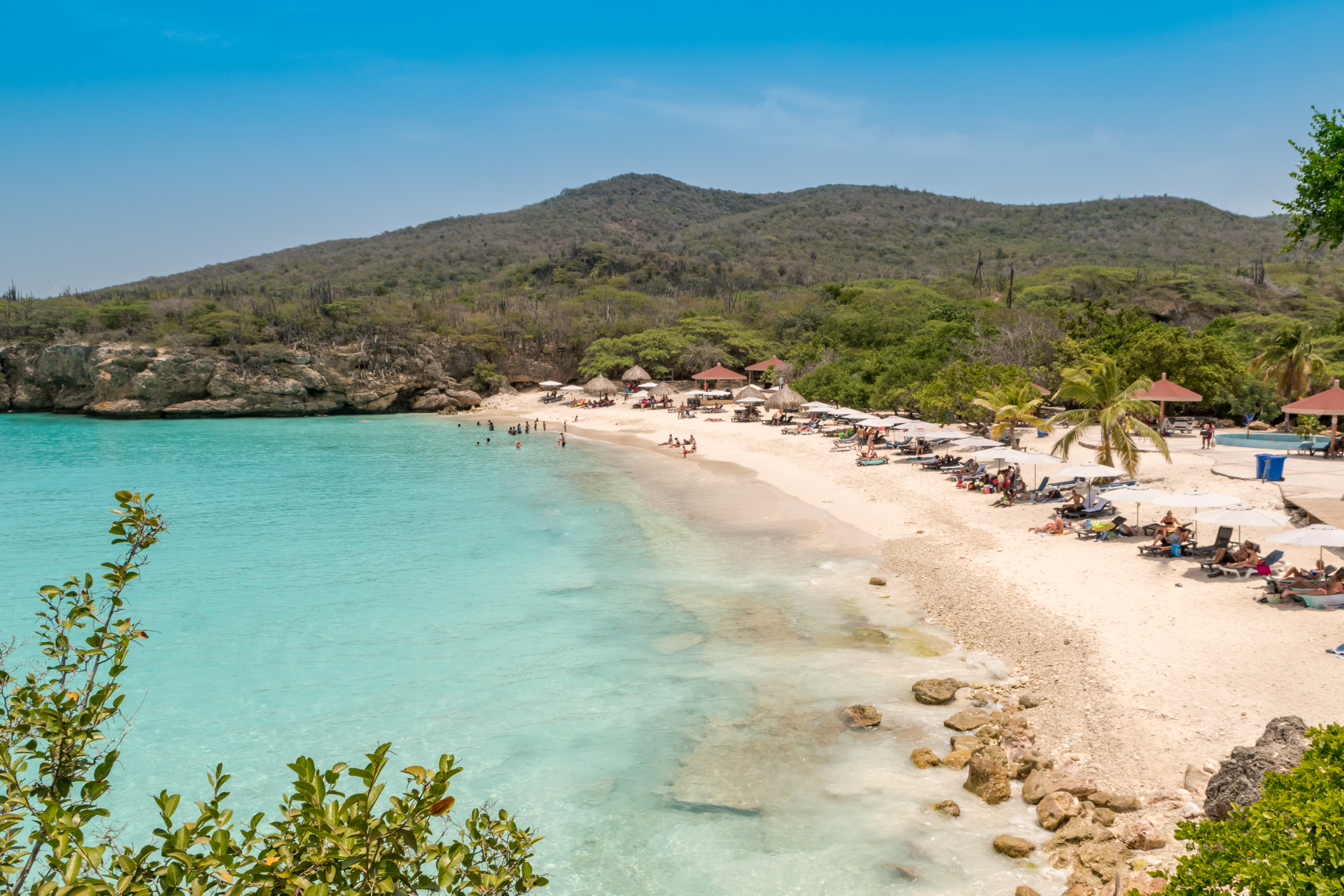
Grote Knip beach

Curaçao has 37 beaches. Most are on the south side of the island. The best known are:

- Baya Beach
- Blue Bay
- Boca Sami
- Daaibooi
- Grote Knip (Kenepa Grandi)
- Kleine Knip (Kenepa Chiki)
- Kokomo Beach
- Mambo Beach
- Piscaderabaai
- Playa Forti
- Playa Jeremi
- Playa Kas Abao
- Playa Kalki
- Playa Kanoa
- Playa Lagun
- Playa Porto Marie
- Playa Santa Cruz
- Playa Santa Barbara
- Seaquarium Beach
- Sint Michielsbaai
- Vaersenbaai
- Westpunt

== Architecture ==
The island has diverse architectural styles reflecting the influence of the various historical rulers over the region, including Spain, the Netherlands, with more modern elements under Western influence primarily including the United States and other European countries. This ranges from ruins and colonial buildings to modern infrastructure.

=== Forts ===
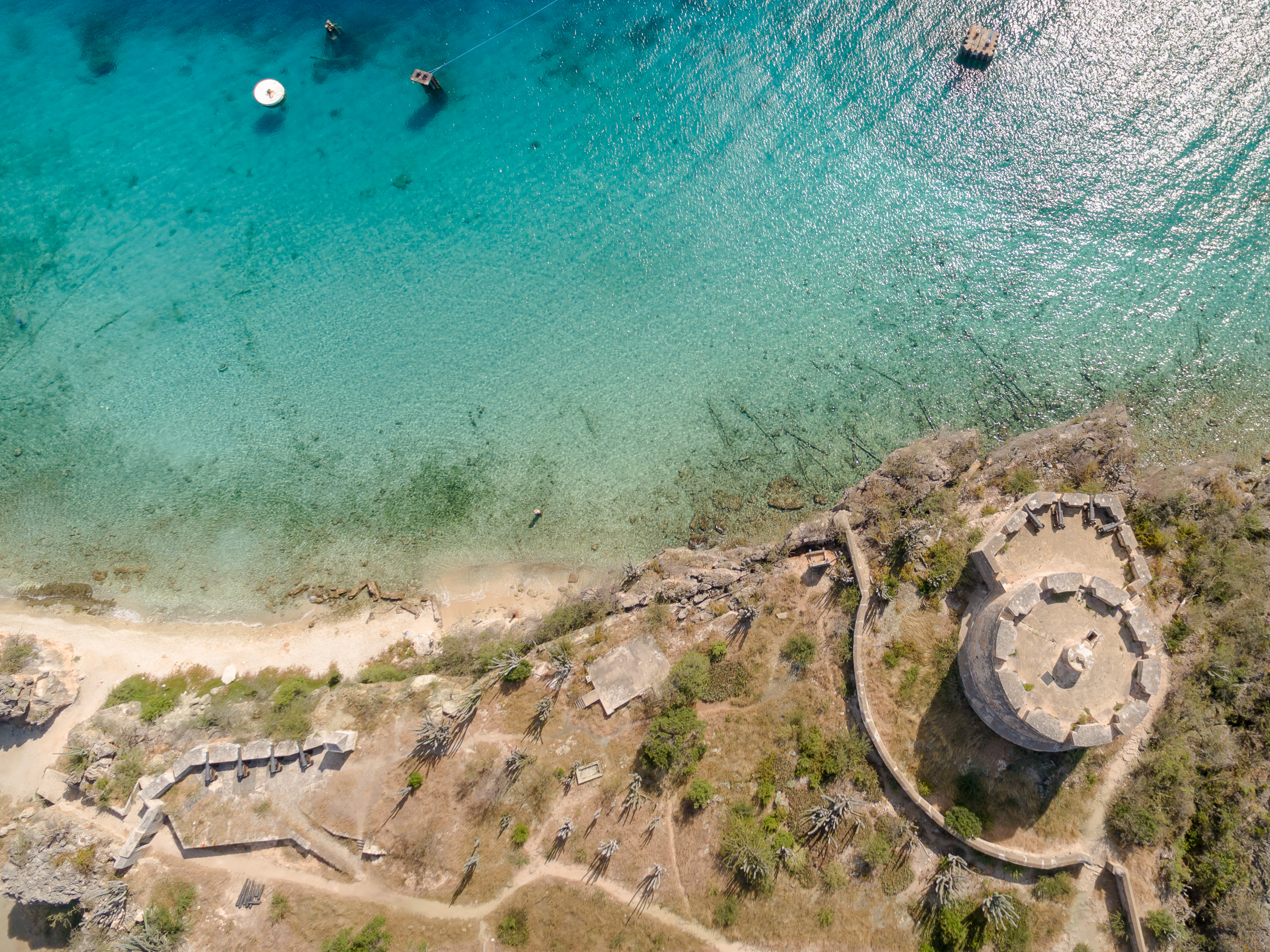
Fort Beekenburg, Caracas Bay, Curaçao

When the Dutch arrived in 1634, they built forts at key points around the island to protect themselves from foreign powers, privateers, and pirates. Six of the best-preserved forts can still be seen today:

- Fort Amsterdam (1635)
- Fort Beekenburg (1703)
- Fort Nassau (1797)
- Waterfort (1826)
- Rif Fort (1828)
- Fort Piscadera (built between 1701 and 1704)

In 1957, the hotel Van der Valk Plaza Curaçao was built on top of the Waterfort.

The Rif Fort is located opposite of the Waterfort, across the Otrobanda harbour entrance. It contains restaurants and shops, and in 2009, the Renaissance Curaçao Resort and Casino opened next to it.

== Government ==
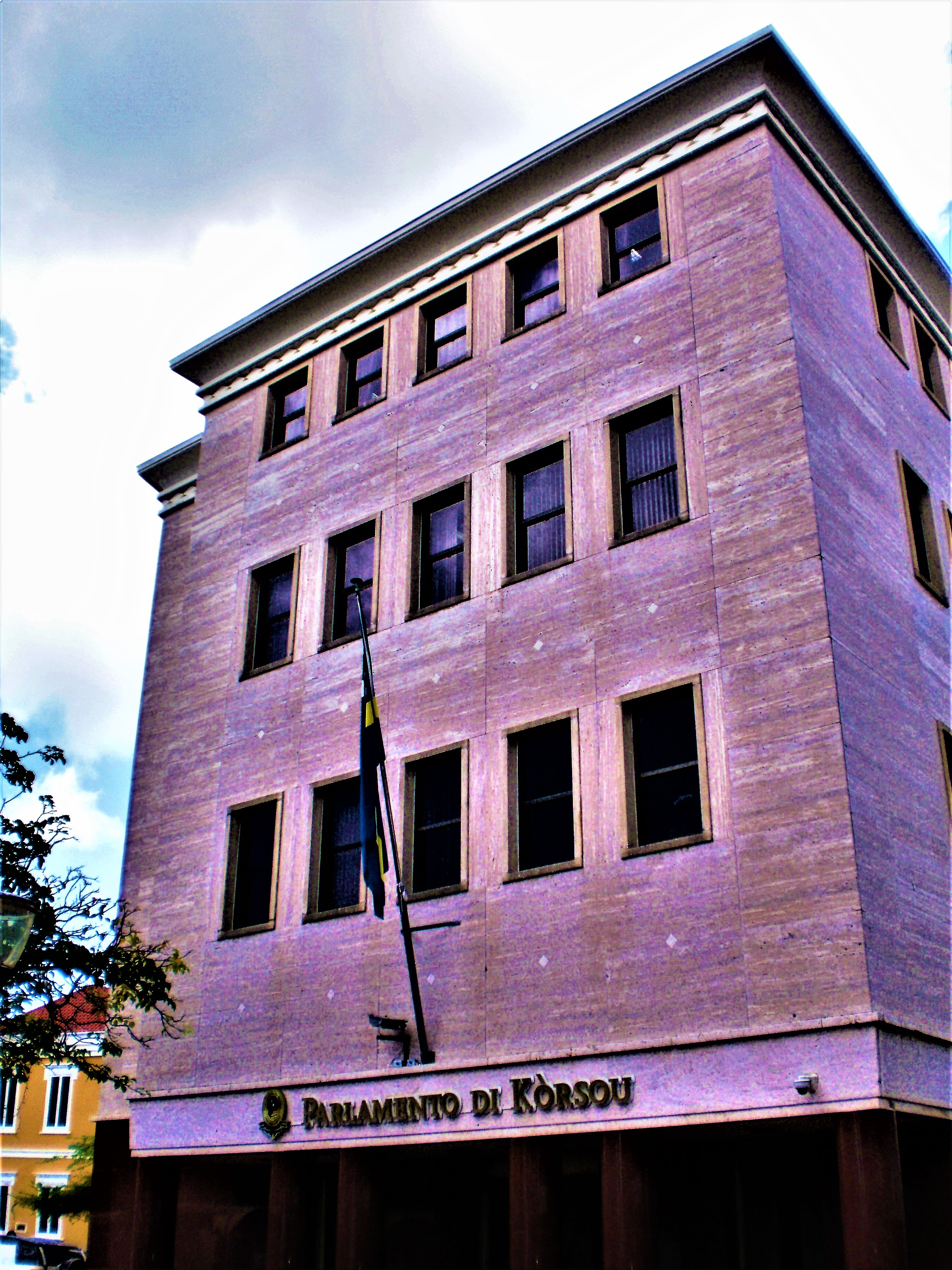
The Curaçao Parliament Building (Parlamento di Kòrsou) in the Punda district of Willemstad

Curaçao is a constituent country of the Kingdom of the Netherlands. Its system of government operates within a framework of parliamentary representative democracy. The King of the Netherlands serves as head of state and is represented locally by the Governor of Curaçao, while the Prime Minister of Curaçao serves as head of government.

Executive power is exercised by the government, while legislative power is vested in both the government and the Estates of Curaçao. The judiciary functions independently of the executive and legislative branches.

Curaçao exercises full autonomy in most domestic affairs. Exceptions are defined in the Charter for the Kingdom of the Netherlands under the category of "Kingdom affairs".

=== Military ===
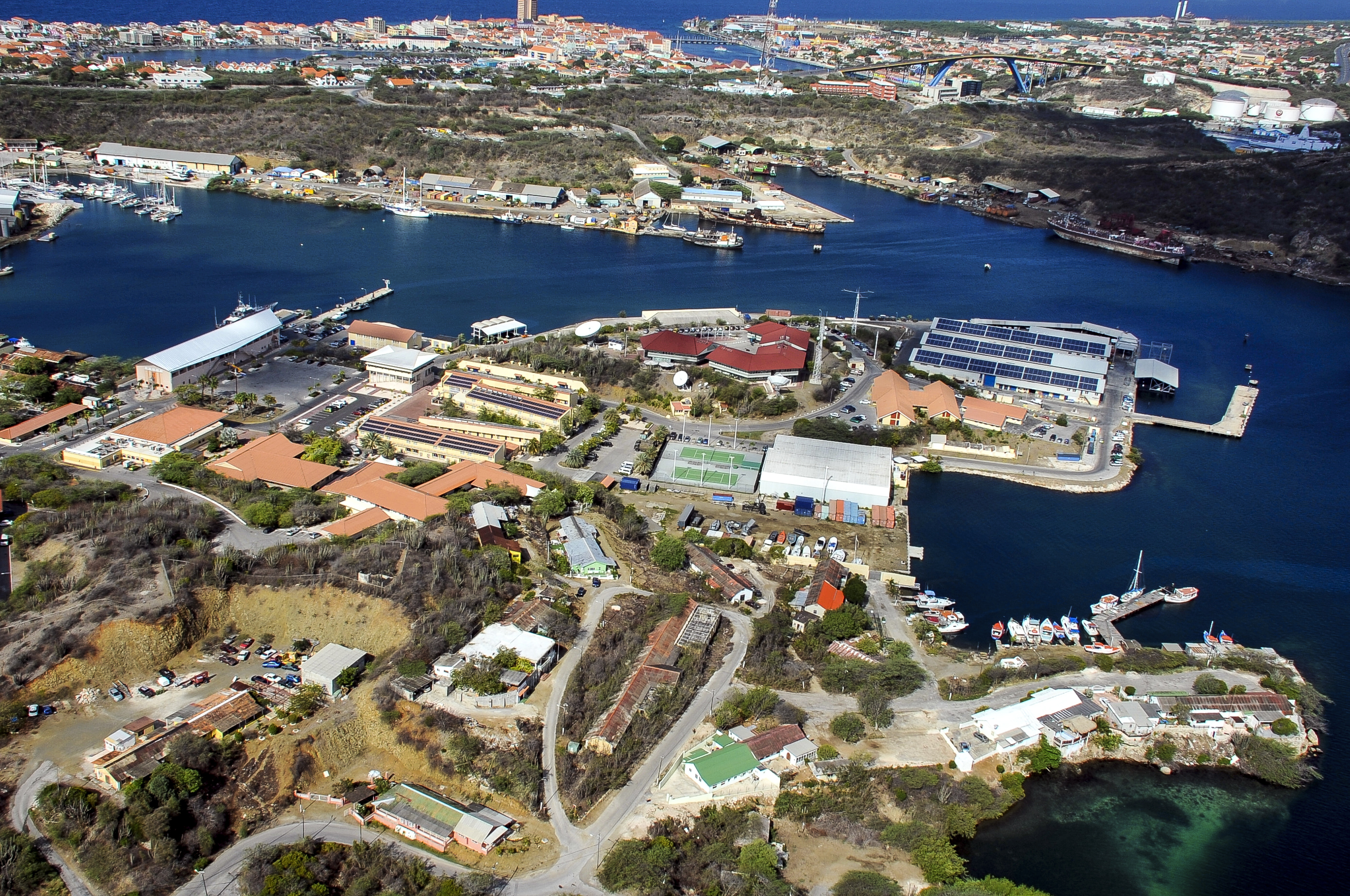
Parera Naval Base

Defence of Curaçao is the responsibility of the Netherlands. The Netherlands Armed Forces maintain both ground and naval units in the Caribbean, some of which are stationed on Curaçao.

These forces include:

- a company of the Royal Netherlands Army deployed on a rotational basis
- a Fast Raiding Interception and Special Forces Craft (FRISC) troop
- a guardship, typically a Holland-class offshore patrol vessel, deployed in the Caribbean on a rotational basis by the Royal Netherlands Navy
- the Royal Netherlands Navy support vessel HNLMS Pelikaan
- Curmil (Curaçaoan) militia elements
- elements of a Royal Marechaussee brigade

The Dutch naval bases of Parera and Suffisant are located on Curaçao. Officers of the Arubaanse Militie receive part of their training on Curaçao. The Curaçao Volunteer Corps is also based at the Suffisant Naval Barracks.

On the western side of Curaçao International Airport are hangars used by the Dutch Caribbean Coast Guard for two Bombardier Dash 8 maritime patrol aircraft and two AgustaWestland AW139 helicopters. Until 2007, the site operated as a Royal Netherlands Navy air station for more than five decades and hosted a variety of aircraft, including Fireflies, Avengers, Trackers, Neptunes, Fokker F-27s, P-3C Orions, Fokker F-60s, and several helicopter types.

The western end of the airport also hosts a United States Air Force (USAF) Forward Operating Location (FOL). The facility supports airborne early warning and control aircraft, cargo aircraft, aerial refuelling aircraft, and reconnaissance aircraft. The PAE corporation operates the facility under contract.

==== Conscription ====
Suffisant Naval Base contains facilities used for conscription and training activities in the Caribbean. Although military conscription ended in 1997, a form of civil conscription was introduced to provide professional and vocational training opportunities for young people from the former Netherlands Antilles.

== Economy ==
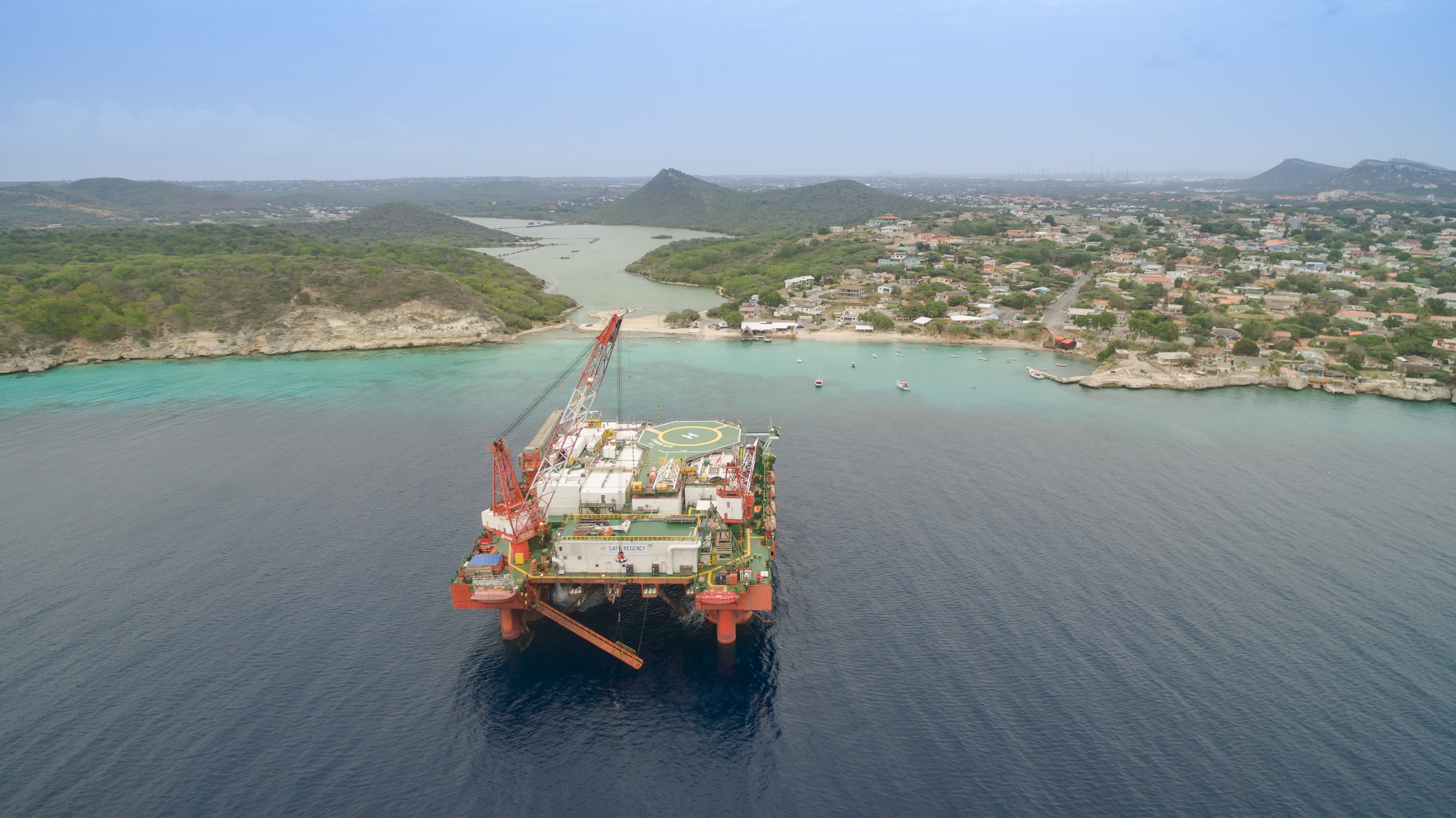
Offshore oil platform in Curaçao

Curaçao has an open economy; its most important sectors are tourism, international trade, shipping services, oil refining, oil storage and bunkering, and international financial services. Venezuelan state oil company PDVSA's lease on the island's oil refinery expired in 2019; the facility employs 1,000 people, refining oil from Venezuela for export to the United States and Asia. Schlumberger, the world's largest oil field services company, is incorporated in Curaçao. The Isla oil refinery is said to be responsible for Curaçao's position as one of the world's top five highest per capita CO_{2} emission-producing countries.

Along with Sint Maarten, Curaçao uses the Caribbean guilder. On 1 July 2025 it formally discontinued the previous currency, the Netherlands Antillean guilder. Its economy is well-developed, supporting a high standard of living, ranking 46th in the world in terms of GDP (PPP) per capita and 27th in the world in terms of nominal GDP per capita. Curaçao possesses a high-income economy as defined by the World Bank.

Activities related to the port of Willemstad, such as the Free Trade Zone, make significant contributions to the economy. To achieve greater economic diversification, the Curaçaoan government is increasing its efforts to attract more foreign investment. This policy, called the "Open Arms" policy, features a heavy focus on attracting information technology companies.

Since 2016, reduced foreign demand for goods due to the ongoing unrest and political uncertainty in Venezuela has led to decreased exports and increased domestic demand for goods and services, resulting in economic stagnation. While many economic sectors contracted, expansion took place in the construction, financial intermediation, and utilities sectors.

=== Tourism ===
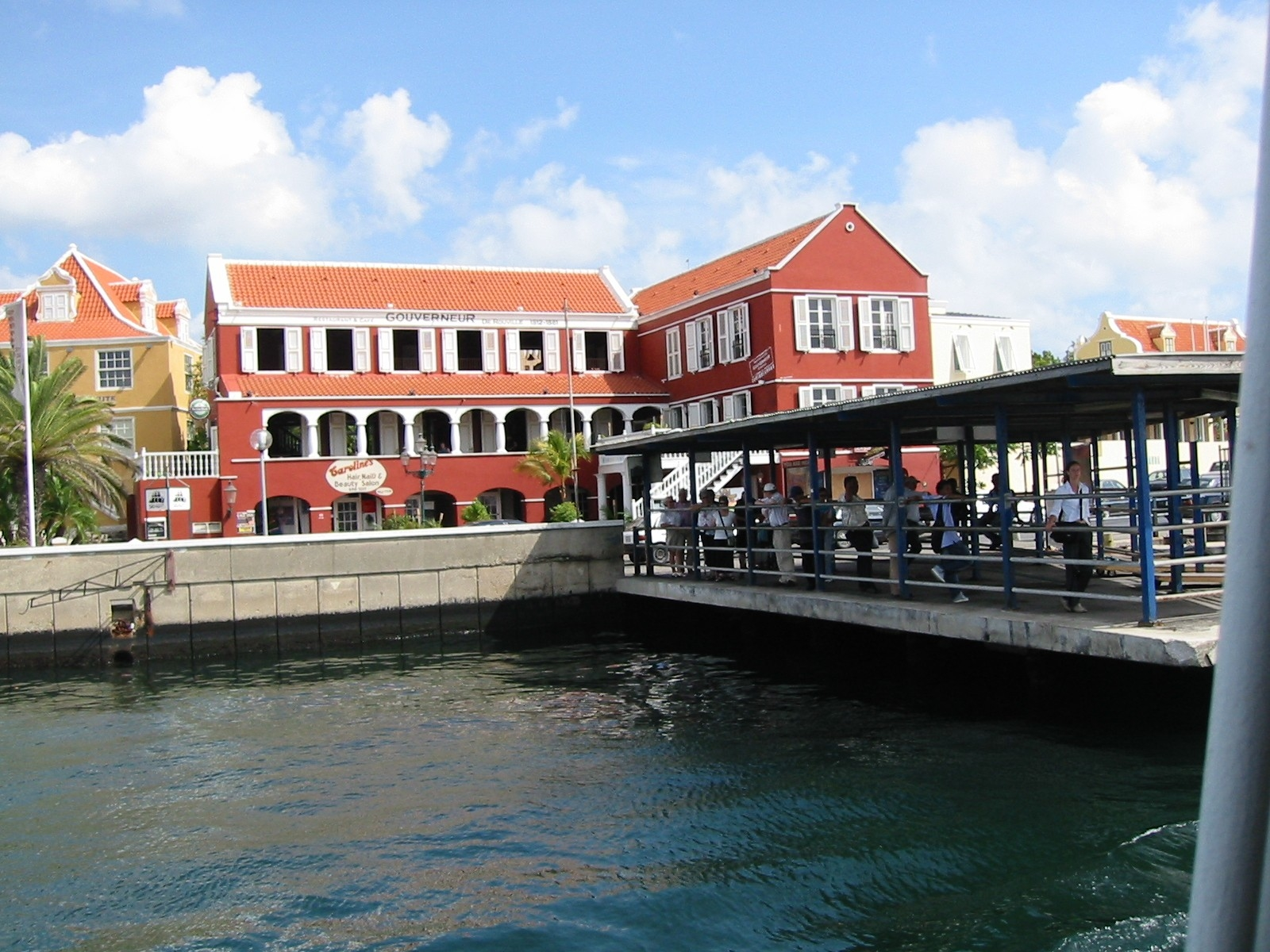
Historic area of Willemstad, declared a World Heritage Site by UNESCO in 1997

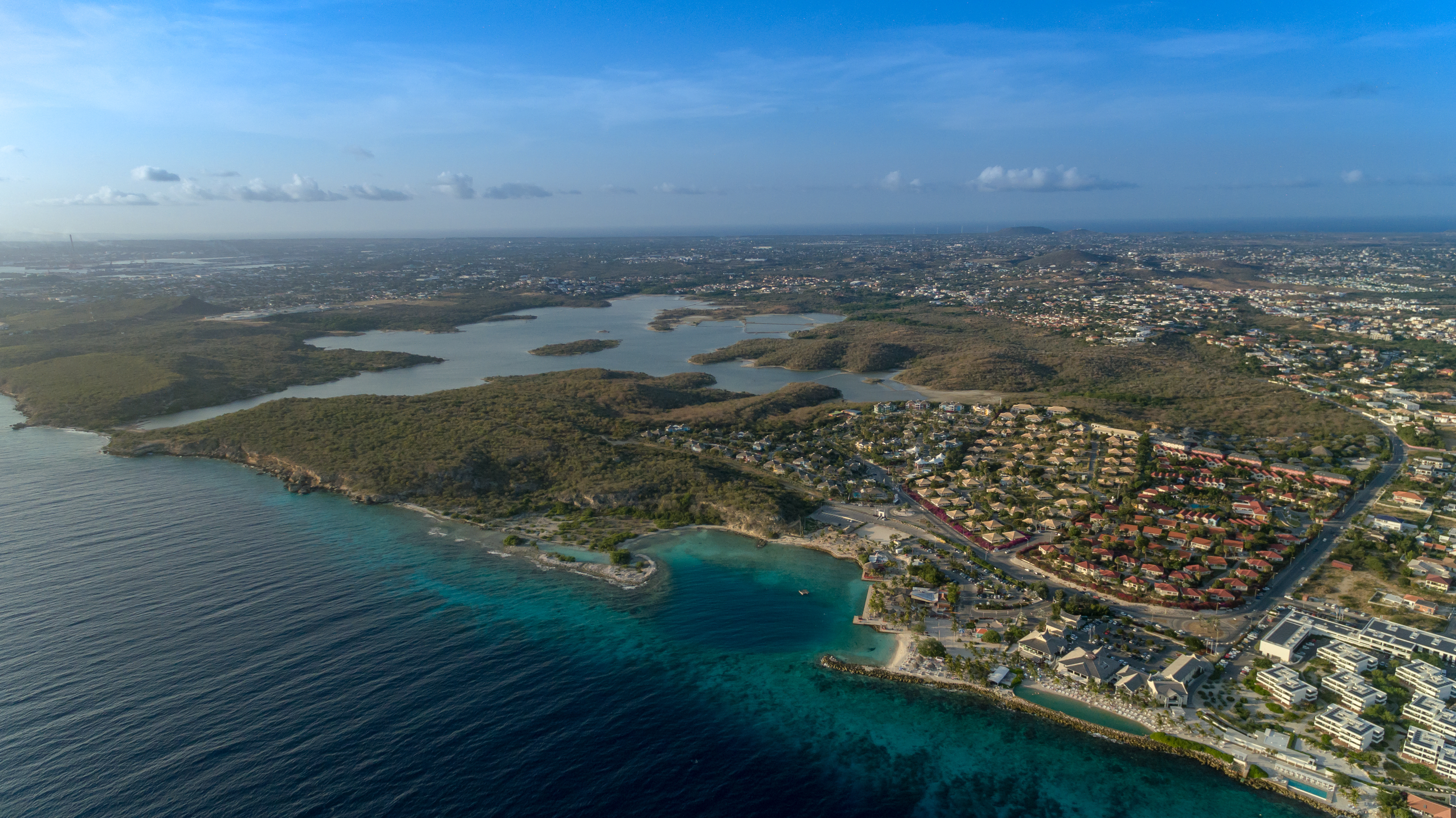
Jan Thiel Beach

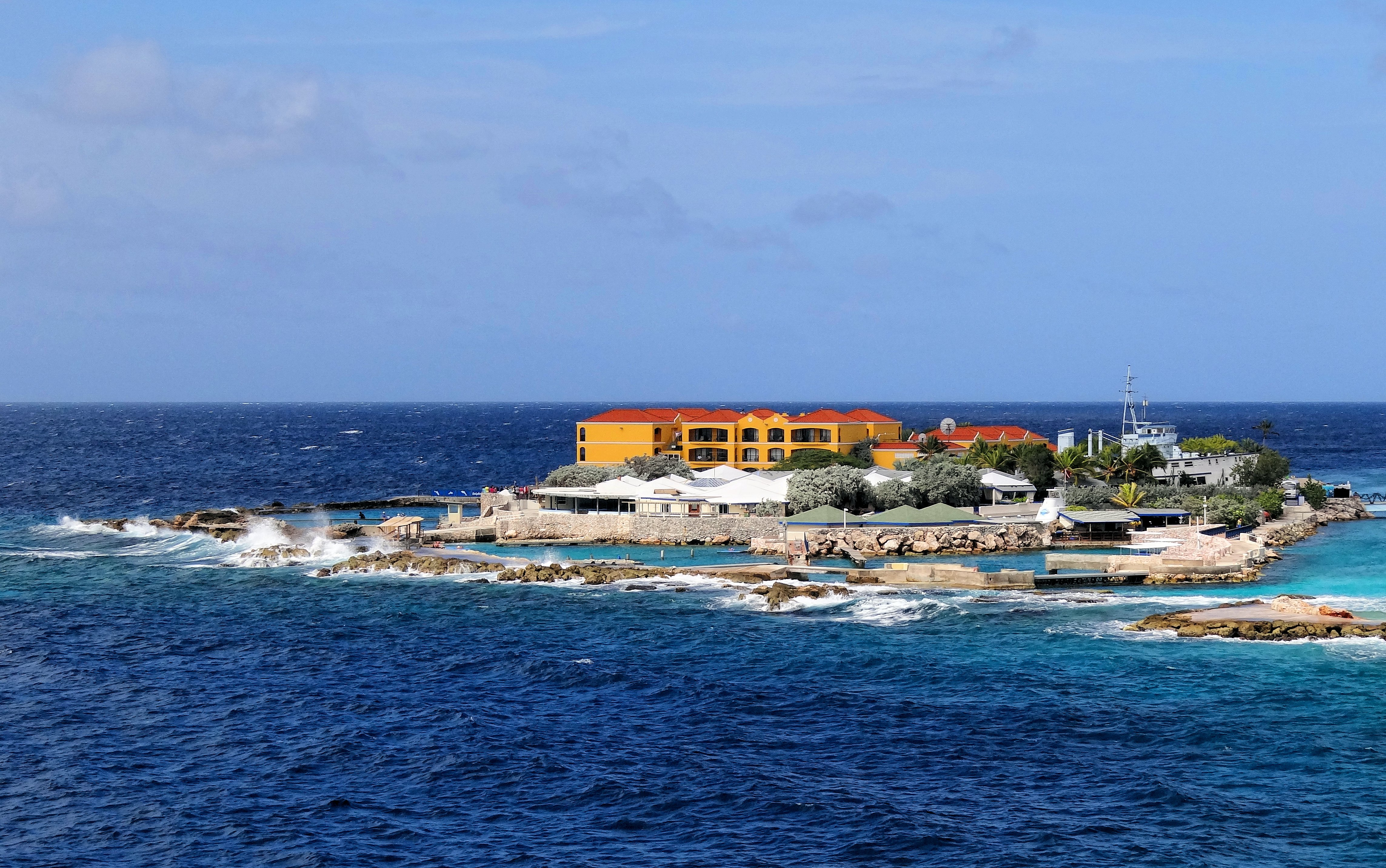
The Curaçao Sea Aquarium and the Dolphin Academy share this islet on the west coast of Curaçao, with Seaquarium Beach nearby.

While tourism plays a major role in Curaçao's economy, the island is less reliant on tourism than many other Caribbean countries. Most tourists come to Curaçao from the Netherlands, the eastern United States, South America and other Caribbean islands. Curaçao was a Caribbean leader in cruise ship tourism growth, with 610,186 cruise passengers in 2013, a 41.4% increase over the previous year. Hato International Airport received 1.7 million passengers in 2013 and announced capital investments totalling US$48 million aimed at transforming the airport into a regional hub by 2018.

The Curaçaoan insular shelf's sharp drop-off known as the "Blue Edge" is often visited by scuba diving tourists. Coral reefs for snorkelling and scuba diving can be reached without a boat. The southern coast has calm waters as well as many small beaches, such as Jan Thiel and Cas Abou. At the westernmost point of the island is Watamula and the Cliff Villa Peninsula which are good locations for drift diving. The coastline of Curaçao features numerous bays and inlets which serve as popular mooring locations for boats.

In June 2017, the island was named the Top Cruise Destination in the Southern Caribbean by Cruise Critic, a major online forum. The winners of the Destination Awards were selected based on comments from cruise passengers who rated the downtown area of Willemstad as "amazing" and the food and shopping as "excellent". The historic centre of Willemstad is a UNESCO World Heritage Site. Another attraction is the town's colourful street art. The Blue Bay Sculpture Garden with works from known Curaçao artists is situated in a nearby resort. Landhuis Bloemhof is an art museum and gallery located in Willemstad.

Some of the coral reefs are affected by tourism. Porto Marie Beach is experimenting with artificial coral reefs to improve the reef's condition. Hundreds of artificial coral blocks that have been placed are now home to a large array of tropical fish. It is now under investigation to see if the sewer waste of hotels is a partial cause of the dying of the coral reef.

Ecotourism is a growing segment of Curaçaoan tourism. Mambo Beach – also known as "Seaquarium Beach" – for example, is a popular destination due to the calm tides for children, frequent viewing of marine life, and coral reefs – some of which have been artificially planted to improve reef health.

=== Labour ===
In 2016, a Labour Force Survey (LFS) indicated that the unemployment rate was 13.3%. For residents ages 15–64, the employment rate was 70.4%.

=== Financial services ===
Curaçao's history in financial services dates back to the First World War. Prior to this period, the financial arms of local merchant houses functioned as informal lenders to the community. However, at the turn of the 20th century, Curaçao underwent industrialization, and a number of merchant houses established private commercial banks. As the economy grew, these banks began assuming additional functions eventually becoming full-fledged financial institutions.

The Dutch Caribbean Securities Exchange is located in the capital of Willemstad, as is the Central Bank of Curaçao and Sint Maarten; the latter of which dates to 1828. It is the oldest central bank in the Western Hemisphere. The island's legal system supports a variety of corporate structures and is a corporate haven. Though Curaçao is considered a tax haven, it adheres to the EU Code of Conduct against harmful tax practices. It holds a qualified intermediary status from the U.S. Internal Revenue Service. It is an accepted jurisdiction of the OECD and Caribbean Financial Action Task Force on Money Laundering.

==== Foreign Account Tax Compliance Act ====
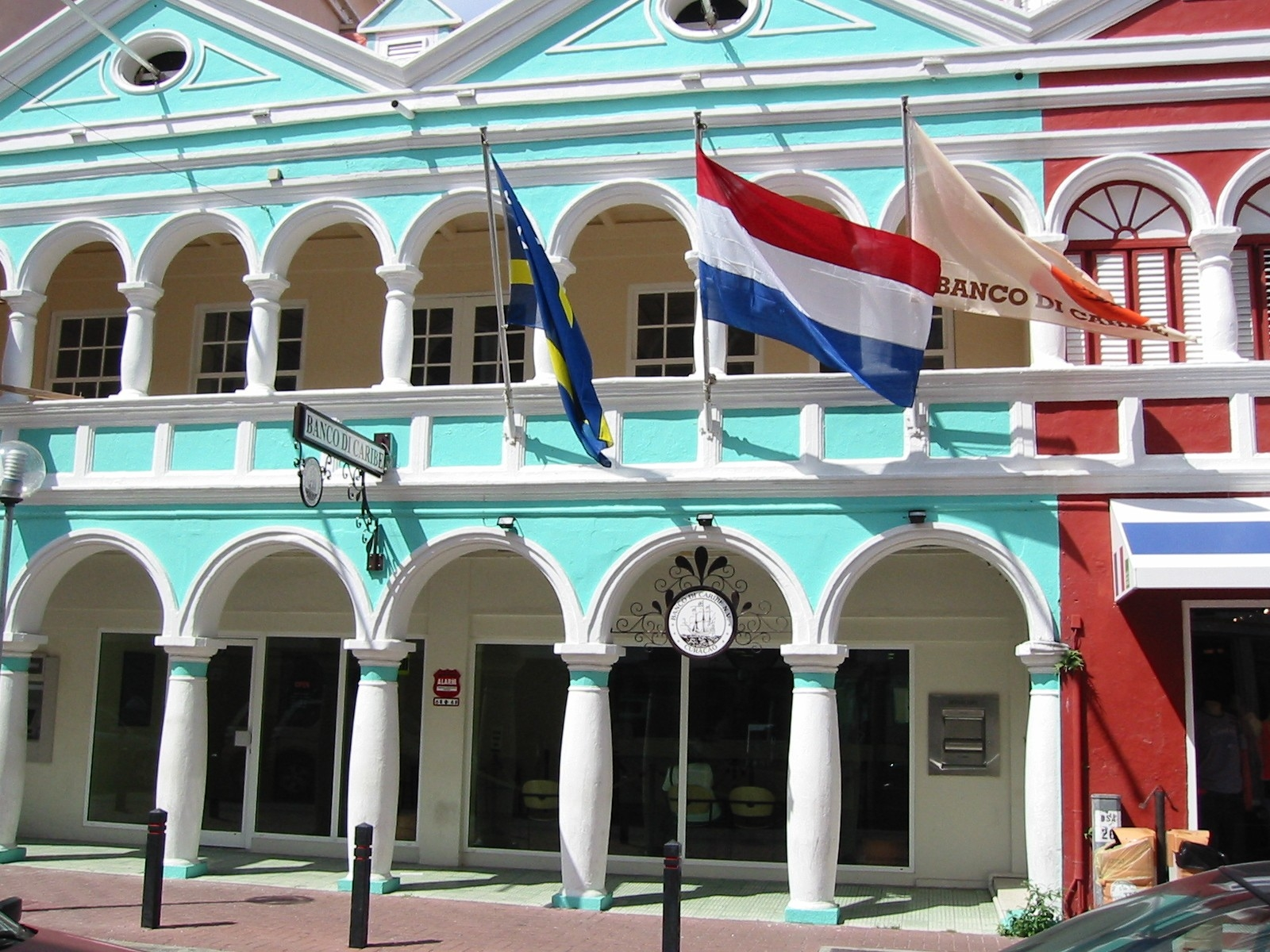
Banco di Caribe in Willemstad

On 30 June 2014, Curaçao was deemed to have an Inter-Governmental Agreement (IGA) with the U.S. with respect to the "Foreign Account Tax Compliance Act". The Tax Information Exchange Agreement, signed in Washington, D.C., on 17 April 2002 between the U.S. and the Kingdom of the Netherlands, includes Curaçao, and was updated with respect to Curaçao in 2014, taking effect in 2016.

=== Trade ===
Curaçao trades mainly with the United States, Venezuela, and the European Union. It has an Association Agreement with the EU which allows companies which do business in and via Curaçao to export products to European markets, free of import duties and quotas. It is also a participant in the U.S. Caribbean Basin Initiative allowing it to have preferential access to the U.S. market.

=== Prostitution ===
Prostitution in Curaçao is legal only for foreign women who get a temporary permit to work in the large open-air brothel called "Le Mirage" or "Campo Alegre". Using prostitution services is legal for men (locals included). The brothel has operated near the airport since the 1940s. Curaçao monitors, contains and regulates the industry. The government states that the workers in these establishments are thereby given a safe environment and access to medical practitioners. However this approach does exclude local women (or men) to legally make a living from prostitution and does lead to loss of local income, as the foreign prostitutes send or take most of their earnings home.

==== Developments of Campo Alegre (2020–2024) ====
Since its closure in 2020 after 71 years of operation, Campo Alegre, Curaçao's largest open-air brothel, has been at the centre of significant developments. Following the closure, a government-appointed working group proposed three scenarios for the site: transforming it into a regulated prostitution area, repurposing it for commercial use, or converting it into a residential area. In 2023, the property was put up for auction, attracting various potential buyers. In a significant move, the Curaçao government purchased the Campo Alegre property, aiming to have more control over its future use. The current ruling political party, Movement for the Future of Curaçao (MFK), had made an election promise to reopen Campo Alegre as a regulated prostitution centre.

As of 2024, the government is evaluating scenarios to ensure that the chosen path will benefit the local economy and social landscape.

The U.S. State Department (DOS) has cited anecdotal evidence claiming that, "Curaçao ...[is a] destination island... for women trafficked for the sex trade from Peru, Brazil, Colombia, the Dominican Republic, and Haiti, according to local observers. At least 500 foreign women reportedly are in prostitution throughout the five islands of the Antilles, some of whom have been trafficked." The DOS has said that the government of Curaçao frequently underestimates the extent of human trafficking problems.

== Demographics ==
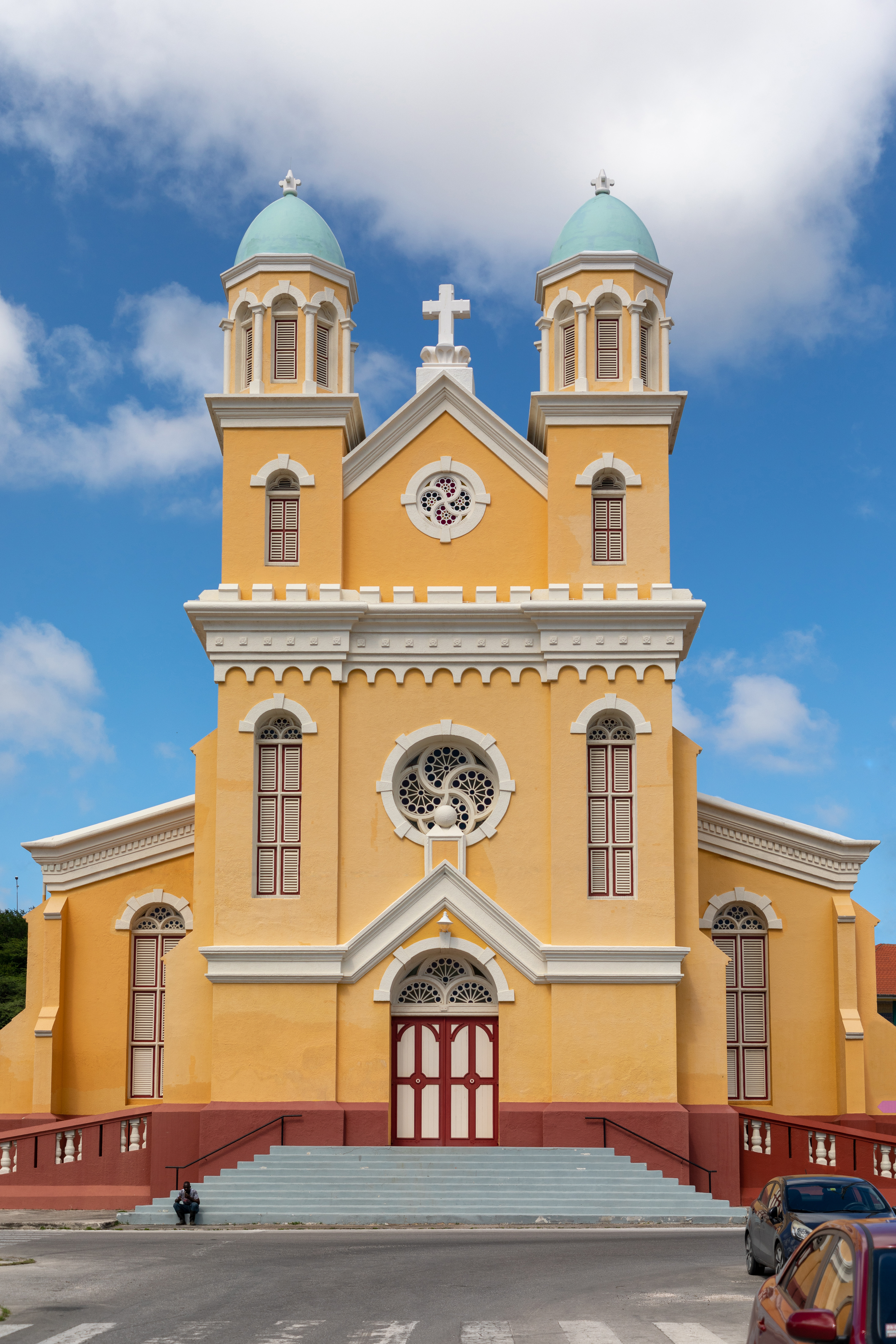
Santa Famia church, Willemstad

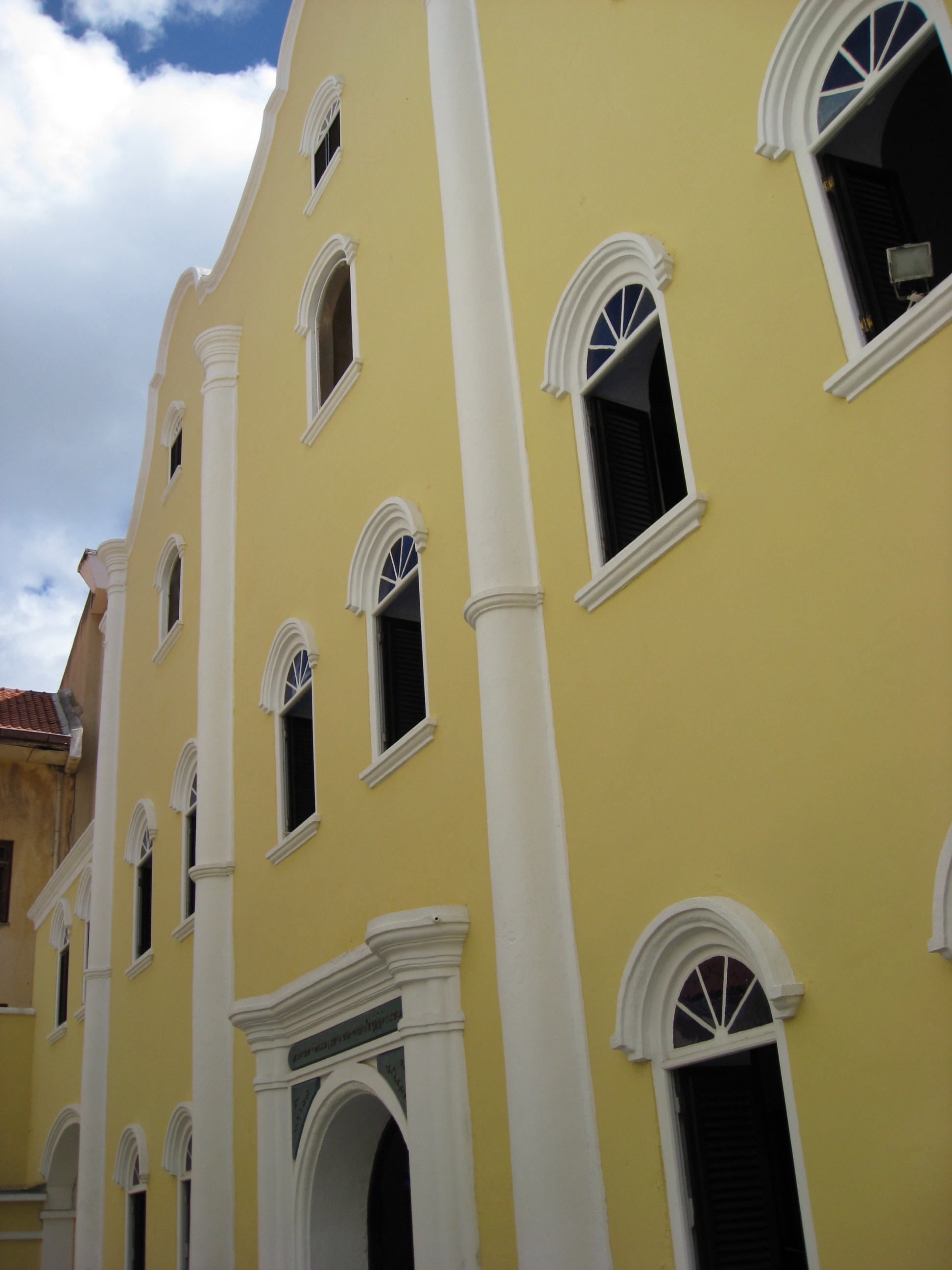
The Mikvé Israel-Emanuel Synagogue in Willemstad is the oldest surviving synagogue in the Western hemisphere.

Owing to the island's colonial past, the majority of Curaçao's population is of full or partial African descent. There are also minorities of Dutch, Portuguese, Jewish, Latin American, South Asian, East Asian and Lebanese descent. According to 2022 data from the CIA, Curacao has a total of only 92 men for every 100 women.

=== Religion ===
Religion in Curaçao
1. Catholic (72.8%)
2. Pentecostal (6.60%)
3. Protestant (3.20%)
4. Adventist (3.00%)
5. Jehovah's Witness (2.00%)
6. Evangelical (1.90%)
7. None (6.00%)
8. Other (Jewish, Muslim, Hindu, etc.) (3.80%)
9. Unspecified (0.60%)

The religious breakdown of the population of Curaçao, according to a 2011 estimate:

- Catholic: 72.8%
- Pentecostal: 6.6%
- Protestant: 3.2%
- Adventist: 3%
- Jehovah's Witnesses: 2%
- Evangelical: 1.9%
- Other: 3.8%
- None: 6%
- Unspecified: 0.6%

The Diocese of Willemstad encompasses all the territory of the Kingdom of the Netherlands in the Caribbean which includes Aruba, Curaçao, Sint Maarten, and the islands of Bonaire, St. Eustatius and Saba. The diocese is also a member of the Antilles Episcopal Conference.

There has been a shift towards the Charismatic movement in recent decades. Other denominations include the Seventh-day Adventist Church and the Methodist Church. Alongside these Christian denominations, some inhabitants practise Montamentu and other diaspora African religions. As elsewhere in Latin America, Pentecostalism is on the rise. There are also practising Muslims and Hindus.

While small, Curaçao's Jewish community has had a significant impact on the island's history. Curaçao has the oldest active Jewish congregation in the Americas, dating to 1651. The Curaçao synagogue is the oldest synagogue of the Americas in continuous use, since its completion in 1732 on the site of a previous synagogue. Additionally, there are both Sephardic and Ashkenazi Jewish communities. As of 2000 there were approximately 300 Jewish people living on the island.

=== Languages ===
First languages of Curaçaoans (2023)
Languages	Percent
Papiamentu	78.0%
Spanish	8.4%
Dutch	7.9%
English	3.8%
Other	1.9%

According to the 2023 census, 78% reported that Papiamentu was the language they most spoke at home; 8.4% reported Spanish, 7.9% Dutch, 3.8% English and 2% other languages.

Curaçao is a multilingual society. The official languages are Dutch, Papiamentu and English. However, Dutch is the sole language for all administration and legal matters. Most of Curaçao's population is able to converse in at least two, though more commonly in all four of the languages of Papiamentu, Dutch, English, and Spanish.

The most widely spoken language is Papiamentu, a Portuguese-based creole with African, Dutch and Spanish influences, which is spoken in all levels of society. Papiamentu was introduced as a language of primary school education in 1993, making Curaçao one of a handful of places where a creole language is used as a medium to acquire basic literacy. During slavery, enslaved Afro-Curaçaoans used the now extinct Guene language to hide their conversations from their enslavers. The language now survives only in songs and popular sayings, where it is a symbol of Afro-Curaçaoan identity.

Spanish and English also have a long historical presence in Curaçao. Spanish became an important language in the 18th century due to the close economic ties with Spanish territories in what are now Venezuela and Colombia. Use of English dates to the early 19th century, when the British occupied Curaçao, Aruba and Bonaire. When Dutch rule resumed in 1815, officials already noted the widespread use of the English language.

=== Localities ===
Curaçao was divided into five districts from 1863 to 1925, after which it was reduced to the two outer districts of Bandabou and Bandariba and the city district of Willemstad. Over the years, the capital, Willemstad, encompassed the entire area surrounding the large natural harbour, the Schottegat. As a result, many formerly isolated villages have grown together to form a large urbanized area. The city covers approximately one third of the entire island in the east. Willemstad's most famous neighbourhoods are:

- Punda, the historic city centre with the Handelskade on St. Anna Bay.
- Otrobanda, on the other side of St. Anna Bay
- Pietermaai, east of Punda
- Scharloo, north of Punda and Pietermaai, across the Waaigat
- Julianadorp, a suburb on the west side of the city, built around 1928 on behalf of Shell for its personnel
- Emmastad, built for Shell in the 1950s, after Julianadorp was full.
- Saliña is situated next to Punda and has many shops and restaurants.
- Brievengat, a suburb in the north of the city.

=== Structure of the population ===
Population Estimates by Sex and Age Group (01.VII.2021) (Provisional) (Post-censal estimates.):

Age group	Male	Female	Total	%
Total	69 285	83 084	152 369	100
0–4	3 876	3 637	7 513	4.93
5–9	4 750	4 479	9 229	6.06
10–14	4 487	4 401	8 888	5.83
15–19	4 503	4 393	8 895	5.84
20–24	3 891	3 665	7 556	4.96
25–29	3 862	4 280	8 142	5.34
30–34	3 966	4 774	8 740	5.74
35–39	4 081	5 091	9 172	6.02
40–44	3 833	5 099	8 932	5.86
45–49	4 563	5 790	10 353	6.79
50–54	5 049	6 323	11 372	7.46
55–59	5 481	7 013	12 493	8.20
60–64	4 937	6 576	11 513	7.56
65–69	4 098	5 523	9 621	6.31
70–74	3 427	4 506	7 932	5.21
75–79	2 163	3 342	5 504	3.61
80–84	1 346	2 146	3 492	2.29
85–89	661	1 283	1 944	1.28
90–94	248	543	791	0.52
95–99	59	192	250	0.16
100+	8	35	43	0.03
Age group	Male	Female	Total	Percent
0–14	13 113	12 517	25 630	16.82
15–64	44 162	52 997	97 159	63.77
65+	12 010	17 570	29 580	19.41

=== Statistics ===
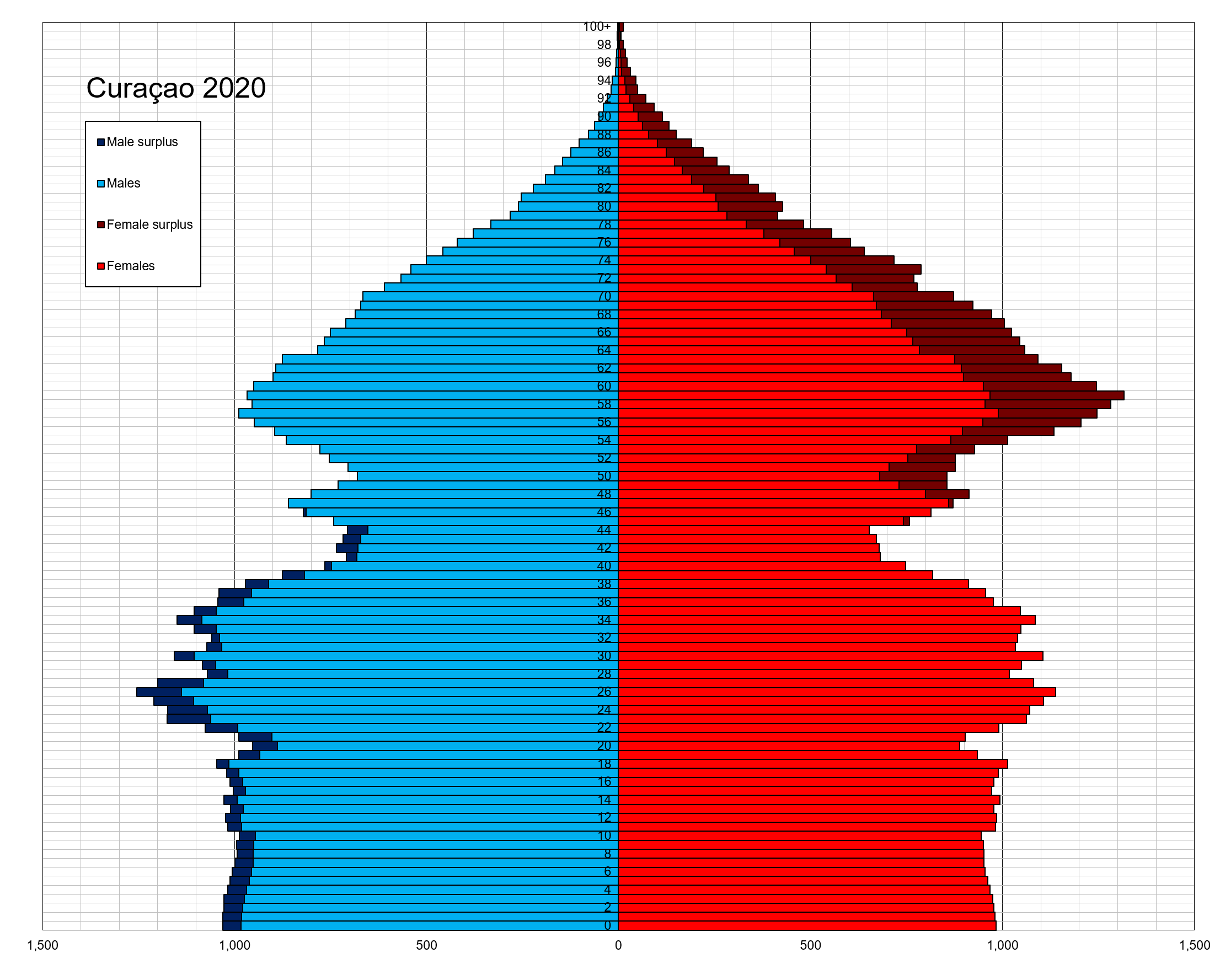
Curaçao population pyramid in 2020

=== Education ===
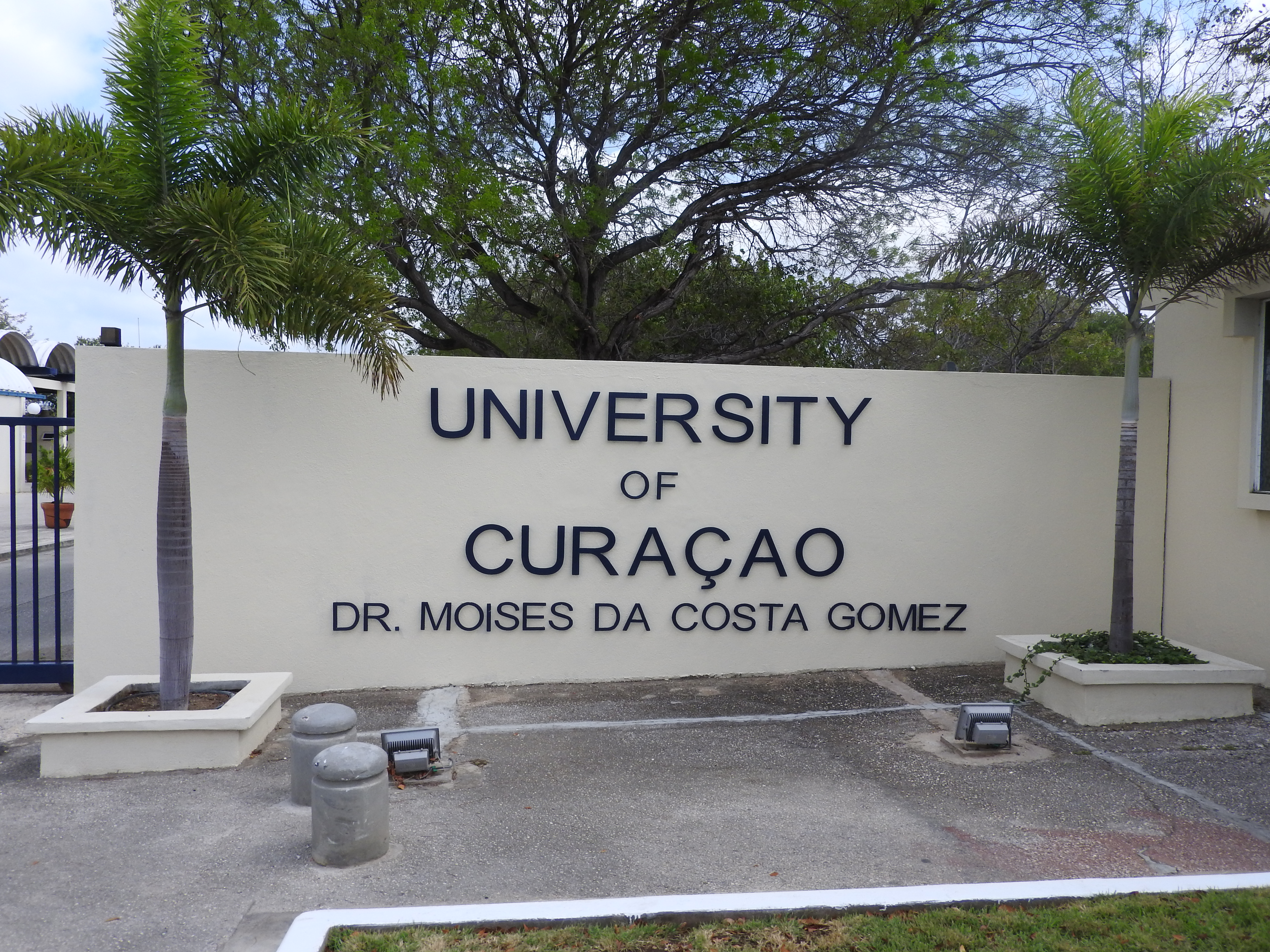
The University of Curaçao

Public education is based on the Dutch educational system and besides the public schools, private and parochial schools are also available. Since the introduction of a new public education law in 1992, compulsory primary education starts at age six and continues for six years; secondary lasts for another four.

The main institute of higher learning is the University of Curaçao (formerly University of The Netherlands Antilles), enrolling 2,100 students. The comprehensive model of education is influenced by both the Dutch and American education systems. Other higher education offerings on the island include offshore medical schools, universities, language schools and academies for fine art, music, police, teacher and nurse-training.

== Culture ==
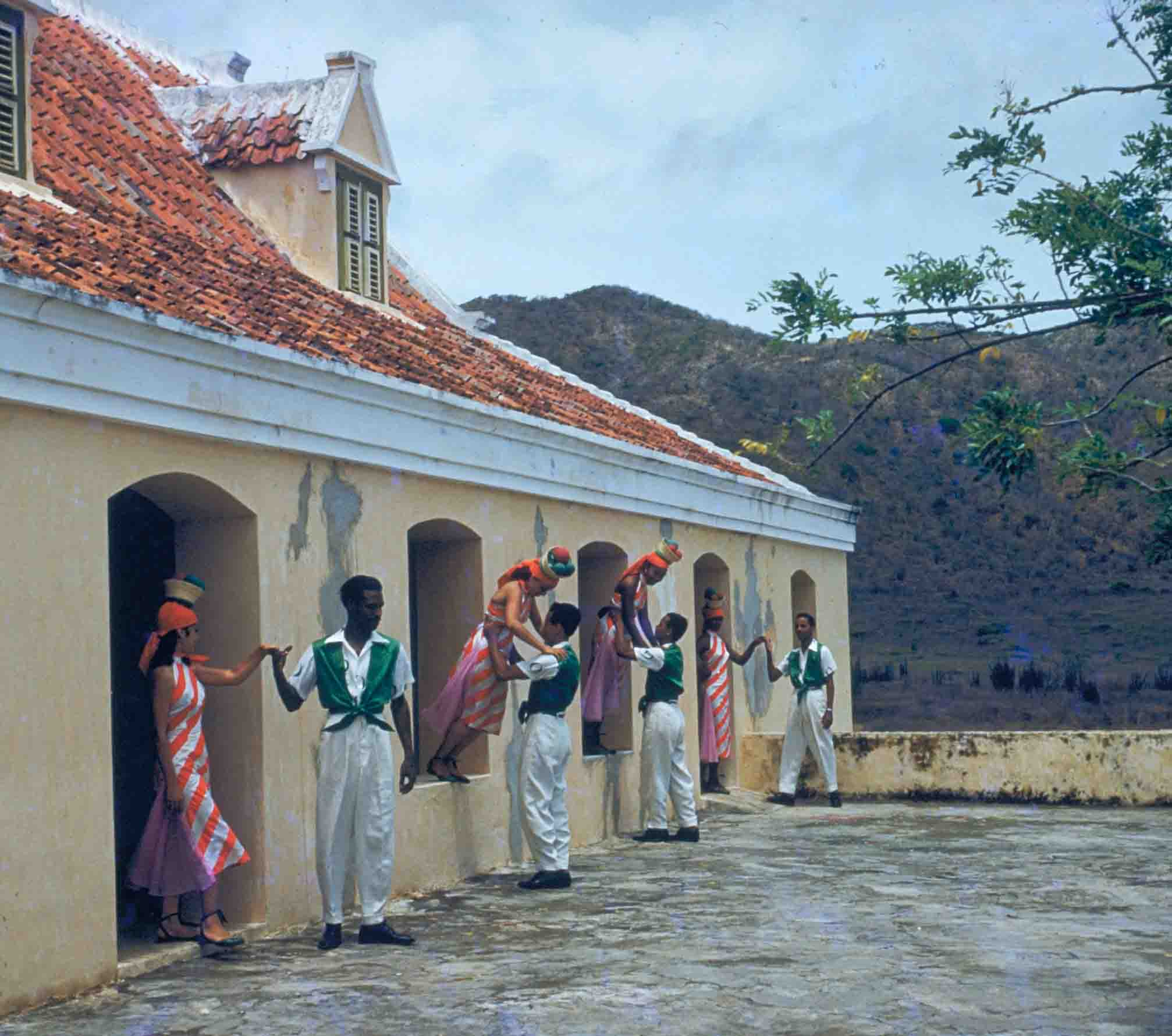
A Bulawaya dance

=== Visual art ===
Visual art in Curaçao encompasses painting, sculptures, and street art.

Curaçao promotes street art with a festival, Kaya Kaya, held in the Otrabanda neighbourhood of Willemstad. The streets of Willemstad are filled with murals from multiple versions of the festival.

=== Literature ===
Despite the island's relatively small population, the diversity of languages and cultural influences on Curaçao have generated a remarkable literary tradition, primarily in Dutch and Papiamentu. The oral traditions of the Arawak indigenous peoples are lost. Enslaved West Africans carried the tales of Anansi, thus forming the basis of Papiamentu literature. The first published work in Papiamentu was a poem by Joseph Sickman Corsen entitled Atardi, published in the La Cruz newspaper in 1905. Throughout Curaçaoan literature, narrative techniques and metaphors best characterized as magic realism tend to predominate. Novelists and poets from Curaçao have contributed to Caribbean and Dutch literature.

=== Cuisine ===
Local food is called Krioyo (pronounced the same as criollo, the Spanish word for "Creole") and is similar in flavours and techniques to Caribbean cuisine and Latin American cuisine. Dishes common in Curaçao are found in Aruba and Bonaire as well. Popular dishes include stobá (a stew made with various ingredients, such as papaya, beef or goat), guiambo (soup made from okra and seafood), kadushi (cactus soup), sopi mondongo (intestine soup), funchi (cornmeal paste similar to fufu, ugali and polenta), fish and other seafood.

The ubiquitous breakfast dish is pastechi: fried pastry with fillings of cheese, tuna, chicken, or ground meat. Around the holiday season special dishes are consumed, such as the hallaca and pekelé, made out of salt cod. At weddings and other special occasions a variety of kos dushi are served: kokada (coconut sweets), ko'i lechi (condensed milk and sugar sweet) and tentalaria (peanut sweets). The Curaçao liqueur was developed in Curaçao, when a local experimented with the rinds of the local citrus fruit known as laraha. Surinamese, Chinese, Indonesian, Indian and Dutch culinary influences also abound.

== Sports ==
Association football and baseball are the island's most popular sports.

=== Football ===
The Curaçao national football team won the 2017 Caribbean Cup by defeating Jamaica in the final, qualifying for the 2017 CONCACAF Gold Cup. They travelled to Thailand and participated in the 2019 King's Cup for the first time, eventually winning the tournament by beating Vietnam in the final.

In 2025, Curaçao qualified for the 2026 FIFA World Cup by winning their group in the final round of the CONCACAF Qualifiers, becoming the smallest nation in history to qualify for a World Cup. In their first match, they lost to Germany 7–1, before drawing to Ecuador 0–0 in the next game to pick up their first ever World Cup point.

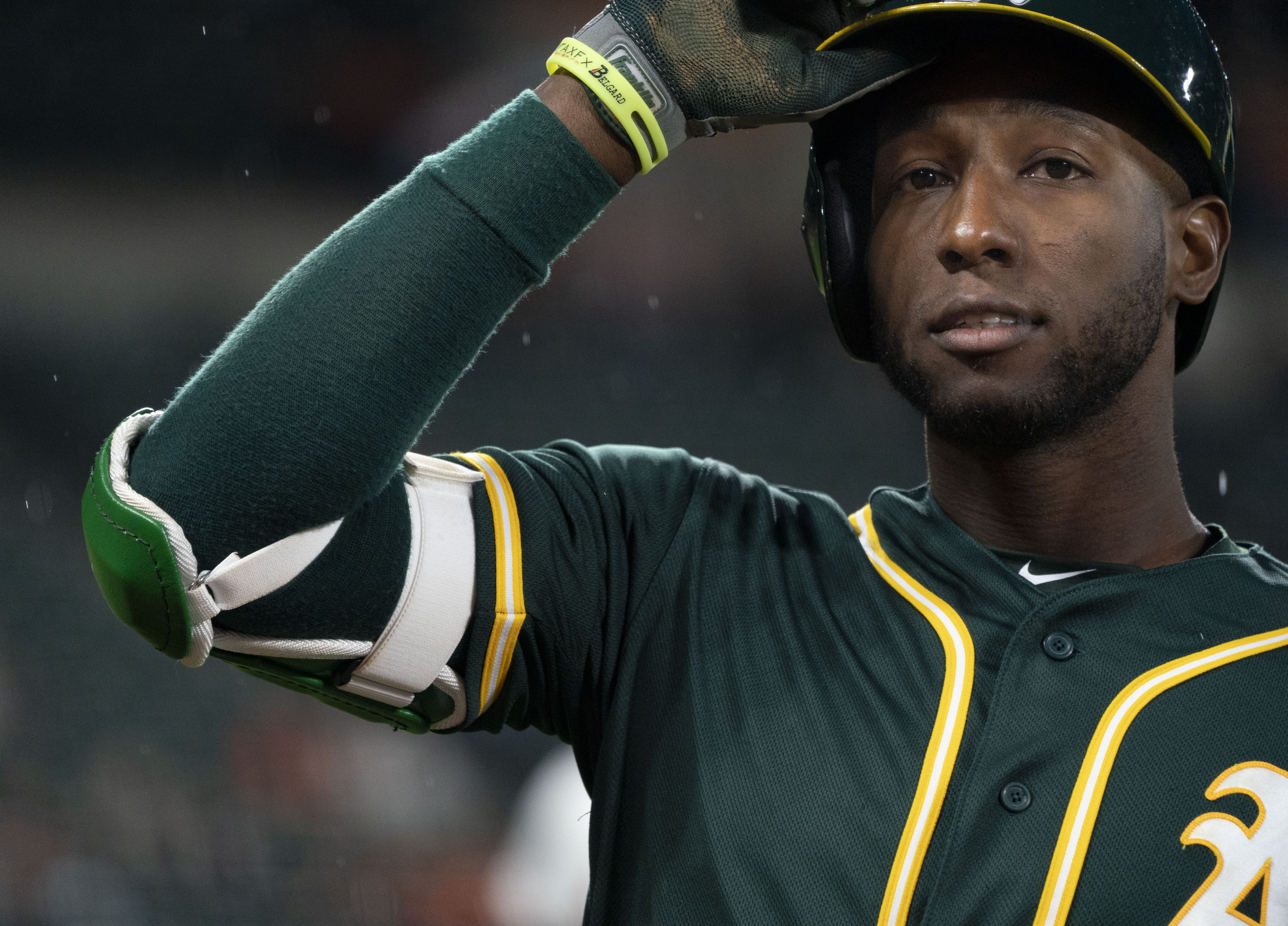
Jurickson Profar

=== Baseball ===
In 2004, the Little League Baseball team from Willemstad, Curaçao, won the world title in a game against the United States champion from Thousand Oaks, California. The Willemstad line-up included Jurickson Profar, the standout shortstop prospect who, as of 2026, is currently on the Atlanta Braves roster of Major League Baseball (MLB); and Jonathan Schoop. On August 30, 2026, the team from Curaçao, Pariba Little League of Willemstad, won the Little League World Series, defeating the U.S. champion team from Henderson, Nevada.

Curaçaoan players Andruw Jones (inducted into the Hall of Fame in 2026), Ozzie Albies, and Kenley Jansen have made multiple MLB All-Star Game appearances.

The 2010 documentary film Boys of Summer details Curaçao's Pabao Little League All-Stars winning their country's eighth straight championship at the 2008 Little League World Series, then going on to defeat other teams, including Puerto Rico and the Dominican Republic, and earning a spot in Williamsport.

=== Other sports ===
The prevailing trade winds and warm water make Curaçao an optimal location for windsurfing.

There is warm, clear water around the island. Scuba divers and snorkelers may have visibility up to 30 metres (98 feet) at the Curaçao Underwater Marine Park, which stretches along 20 kilometres (12 miles) of Curaçao's southern coastline.

Curaçao participated in the 2013 CARIFTA Games. Kevin Philbert stood third in the under-20 male long jump with a distance of 7.36 metres (24.15 feet). Vanessa Philbert stood second the under-17 female 1,500 metres (4,900 feet) with a time of 4:47.97.

== Infrastructure and transportation ==
=== Airport ===
Curaçao International Airport (also called Hato International Airport) is located on the northern coast of the island and offers connections to the Caribbean region, South America, North America and Europe. Curaçao Airport is a fairly large facility, with the third longest commercial runway in the Caribbean region after Rafael Hernández Airport in Puerto Rico and Pointe-à-Pitre International Airport in Guadeloupe. Curaçao international airport served as a main base for Insel Air, and for Air ALM, the former national airlines of Curaçao.

=== Railways ===
In 1887 a horse drawn street tramway opened in Punda, the part of the capital Willemstad on the eastern side of Sint Annabaai. It had a U-shaped route about 2 km (1.2 mi) in length. In 1896, a tramway opened in Otrabanda on the opposite side of the bay, but it ceased operations within a few months. The Punda line was rebuilt in 1911, regauged to metre gauge, and the horse-drawn trams replaced by petrol engined ones. The line closed in 1920.

=== Public transportation ===
ABC (Dutch: Auto Busbedrijf Curaçao, "Curaçao Bus Company") provides bus transportation in and around Willemstad with 21 lines, all departing from either Otrabanda and Punda bus stations, including lines 4A, 2A, 2B and 2C serving the airport. Fares range from 2.00 to 2.50 guilders.

=== Bridges ===
The Queen Emma Bridge, a 168-metre (551 ft)-long pontoon bridge, allows pedestrians to walk between the Punda and Otrobanda districts. The bridge swings open to allow the passage of ships to and from the port. The bridge was originally opened in 1888 and the current bridge was installed in 1939. It is best known and, more often than not, referred to by the locals as "Our Swinging Old Lady".

The Queen Juliana Bridge carries motor vehicle traffic between the same two districts and its opening allowed the Queen Emma Bridge to become a pedestrian-only bridge. During its construction it collapsed in 1967, with fifteen worker casualties. After that, construction was restarted and finished in 1974. At 185 feet (56 m) above the sea, the Queen Juliana Bridge is one of the highest bridges in the Caribbean.

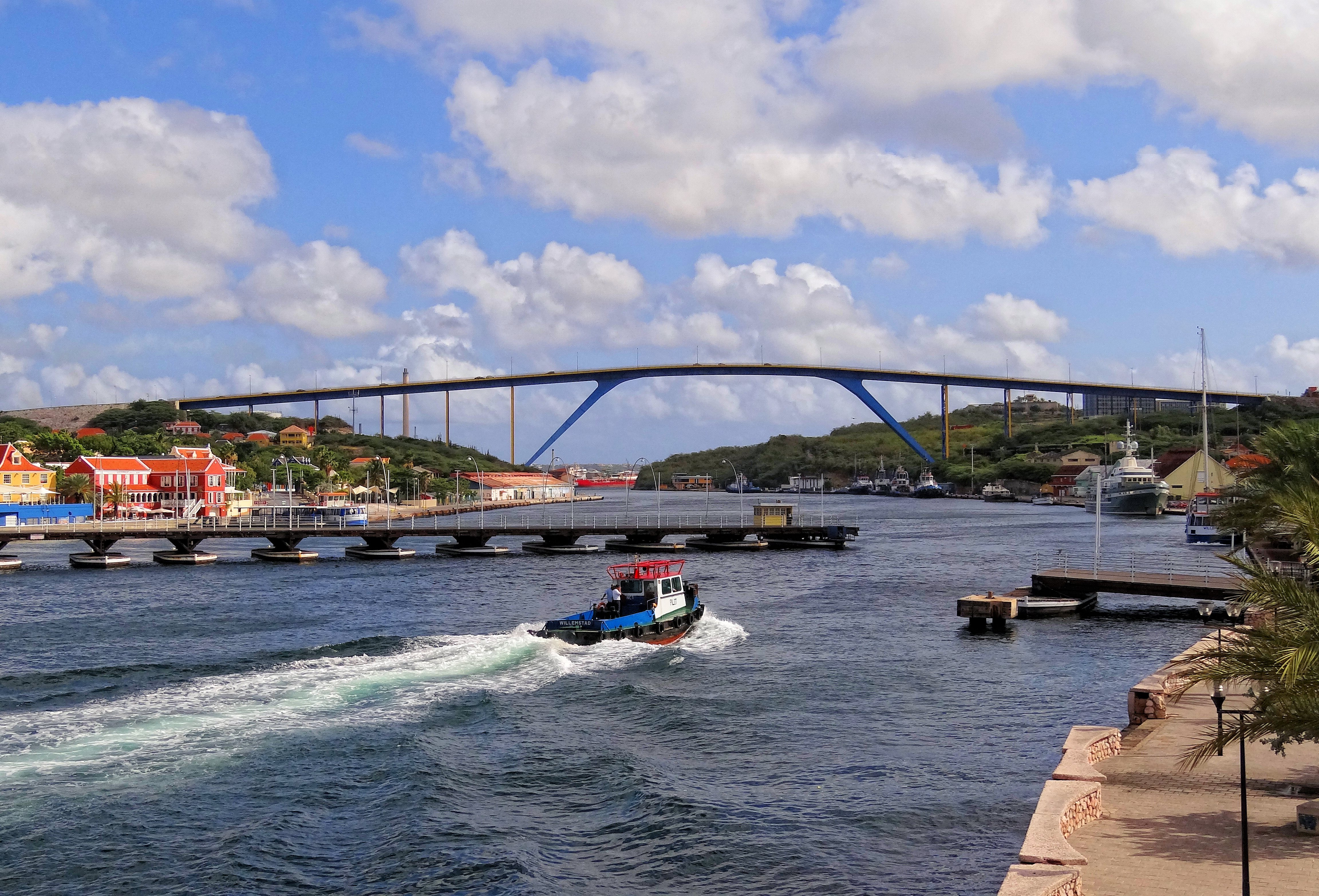
The Queen Emma (semi-open), and the Queen Juliana

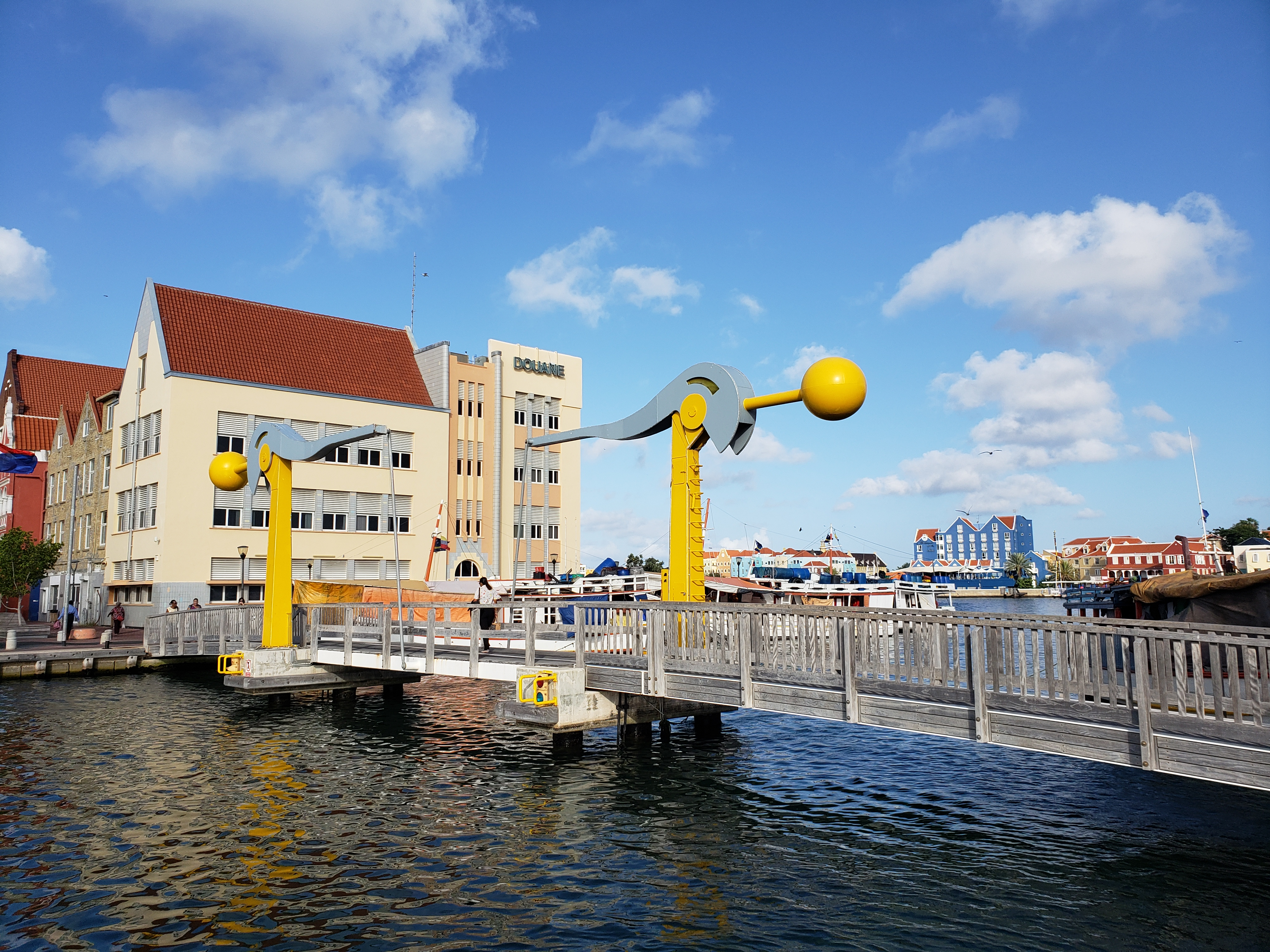
Smith brug over the Waaigat

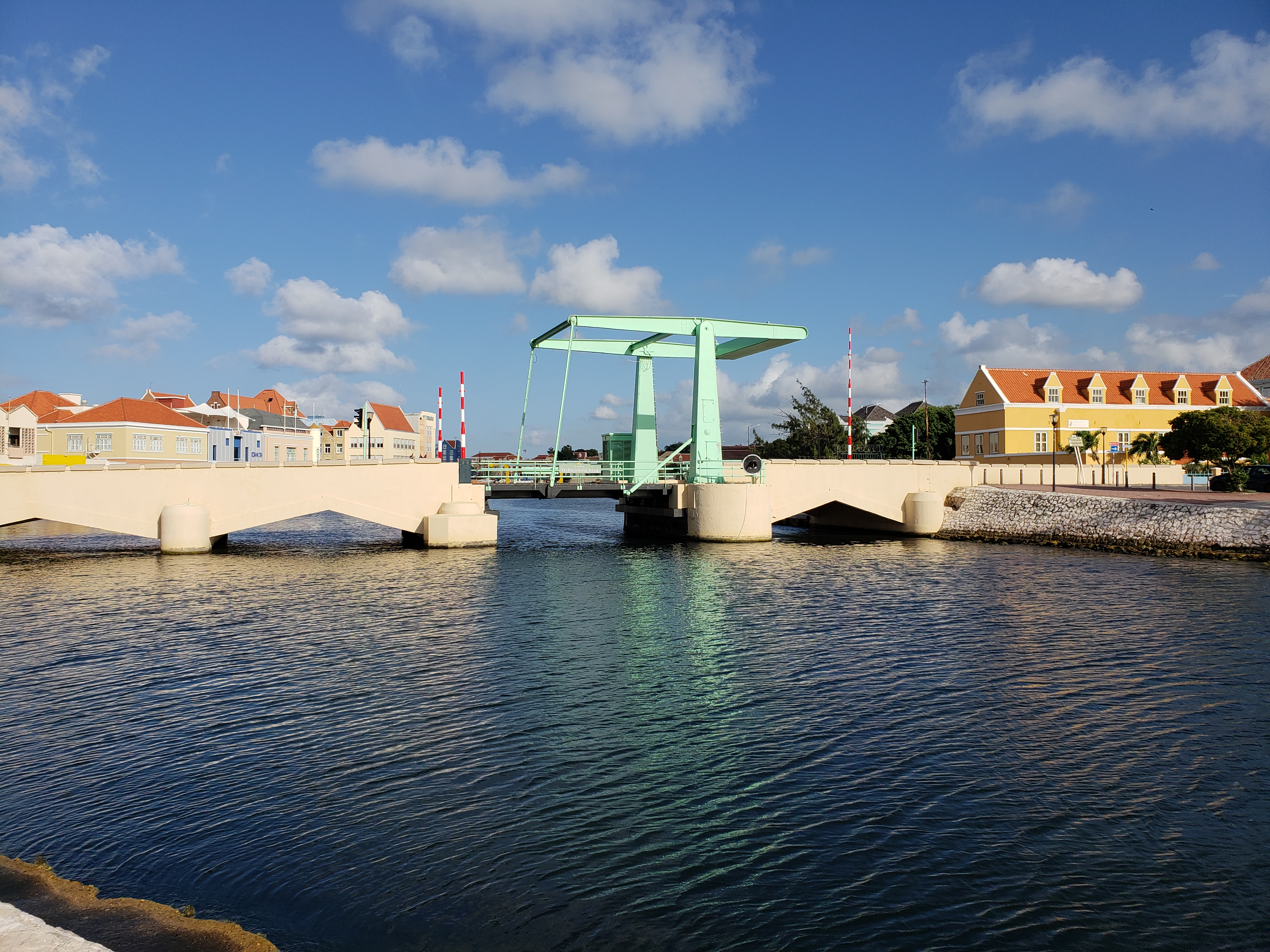
Kon. Wilhelmina brug over the Waaigat

=== Utilities and sanitation ===
Aqualectra, a government-owned company and a full member of CARILEC, delivers potable water and electricity to the island. Rates are controlled by the government. Water is produced by reverse osmosis or desalinization. It serves 69,000 households and companies using 130,000 water and electric meters. The power generation company NuCuraçao opened wind farms in Tera Kora and Playa Kanoa in 2012, and expanded in Tera Kora in 2015. There is no natural gas distribution grid; gas is supplied to homes by pressurized containers.

Curbside trash pick-up is provided by the Selikor company. There is no recycling pick-up, but there are drop-off centres for certain recycled materials at the Malpais landfill, and various locations operated by Green Force; private haulers recycle construction waste, paper, and cardboard.

== See also ==
- List of Curaçaoans
- History of the Jews in Curaçao
- Leeward Antilles – Island group in the Caribbean
- Religion in Curaçao
- Telecommunications in Curaçao

== Sources ==
- Habitantenan di Kòrsou, sinku siglo di pena i gloria: 1499–1999. Römer-Kenepa, NC, Gibbes, FE, Skriwanek, MA., 1999. Curaçao: Fundashon Curaçao 500.
- Social movements, violence, and change: the May Movement in Curaçao. WA Anderson, RR Dynes, 1975. Columbus: Ohio State University Press.
- Stemmen uit het Verleden. Van Buurt, G., Joubert, S., 1994, Curaçao.
- Het Patroon van de Oude Curaçaose Samenleving. Hoetink, H., 1987. Amsterdam: Emmering.
- Dede pikiña ku su bisiña: Papiamentu-Nederlands en de onverwerkt verleden tijd. van Putte, Florimon., 1999. Zutphen: de Walburg Pers
