= Hoyer =

Hoyer or Høyer can refer to:

== People ==
Surname

- Anna Ovena Hoyer (1584-1655), German writer and poet, active in Sweden
- Arne Høyer (1928-2010), Danish sprint canoeist who competed in the 1960 Summer Olympics
- Arnold Hoyer (...-1967 ), German guitar maker
- Bizzie Høyer (1888-1971), Danish painter and art teacher
- Bjarne Hoyer (1912-1991), Danish composer
- Brian Hoyer (born 1985), American football quarterback
- Claus Høyer (1891-1923), Norwegian rower who competed in the 1912 Summer Olympics
- Cornelius Høyer (1741-1804), Danish painter
- Craig Hoyer (born 1960), Australian rules footballer
- Didier Hoyer (born 1961), French sprint canoeist
- Dore Hoyer (1911-1967), German expressionist dancer and choreographer
- Doug Hoyer (active since 2003), Canadian pop-rock artist
- Elizabeth Hoyer-Millar (1910-1984), British naval officer
- Eric G. Hoyer (1898-1990), American interior designer and politician in Minnesota
- Henryk Ferdynand Hoyer (1864–1947), Polish comparative anatomist
- Henryk Fryderyk Hoyer (1834–1907), Polish histologist
- Gurth Hoyer-Millar (1929-2014), Scottish rugby union international and first-class cricketer
- Hans Hoyer (1890-1917), German artilleryman and fighter ace in World War I
- Harald Hoyer (born 1971), German-Austrian computer programmer and photographer
- Hein Hoyer (c. 1380–1447), German statesman and mayor of Hamburg
- Ida Hegazi Høyer (born 1981), Norwegian writer
- Jed Hoyer (born 1973), American general manager of MLB clubs
- Jimmy Høyer (born 1978), Danish footballer
- Johann Adam Hoyer (died 1838), Austrian clockmaker
- Johann Georg Hoyer (1663– 1737/1738), German physician
- Johannes Høyer (1883 – after 1939), Norwegian judge and politician
- Katja Hoyer (born 1985), German historian and writer
- Luidjino Hoyer (born 1988), Curaçaoan footballer
- Mario Hoyer (born 1965), bobsledder who competed for East Germany in the 1988 Winter Olympics
- Peter Lichtner-Hoyer (1925–2020), Austrian sportsman who competed in the 1956 and 1960 Summer Olympics
- Saimi Hoyer (born 1974), Finnish model and television personality
- Steny Hoyer (born 1939), United States Representative for Maryland's 5th congressional district
- Sylvain Hoyer (active 1994-1999), French sprint canoeist
- Werner Hoyer (born 1951), German politician

Given name

- Colonel Thomas Hoyer Monstery (1824-1901), Danish-American fencing and boxing instructor, duelist and soldier-of-fortune
- Jens Hoyer Hansen (1940-1999), Danish-born jeweller who relocated to New Zealand
- Lone Høyer Hansen (1950–2021), Danish sculptor
- Poul-Erik Høyer Larsen (born 1965), Danish badminton player

== Other uses ==
- Høyer-Ellefsen, a Norwegian former company
- Hoyer Guitars, a German manufacturer of guitars
- Josh Hoyer & Soul Colossal, an American soul/funk/R&B band

== See also ==
- Chalmer & Hoyer, a defunct British coachbuilding company
- Fraser-Hoyer House, a historic home located at West Haverstraw in Rockland County, New York
- Hoyerhagen, a municipality in the district of Nienburg, in Lower Saxony, Germany
- Hoyershausen, a town in the district of Hildesheim in Lower Saxony, Germany
- Hoyerswerda, a town in the German Bundesland of Saxony
- James, Hoyer, Newcomer & Smiljanich, P.A., an American law firm
