= List of populated places in Curaçao =

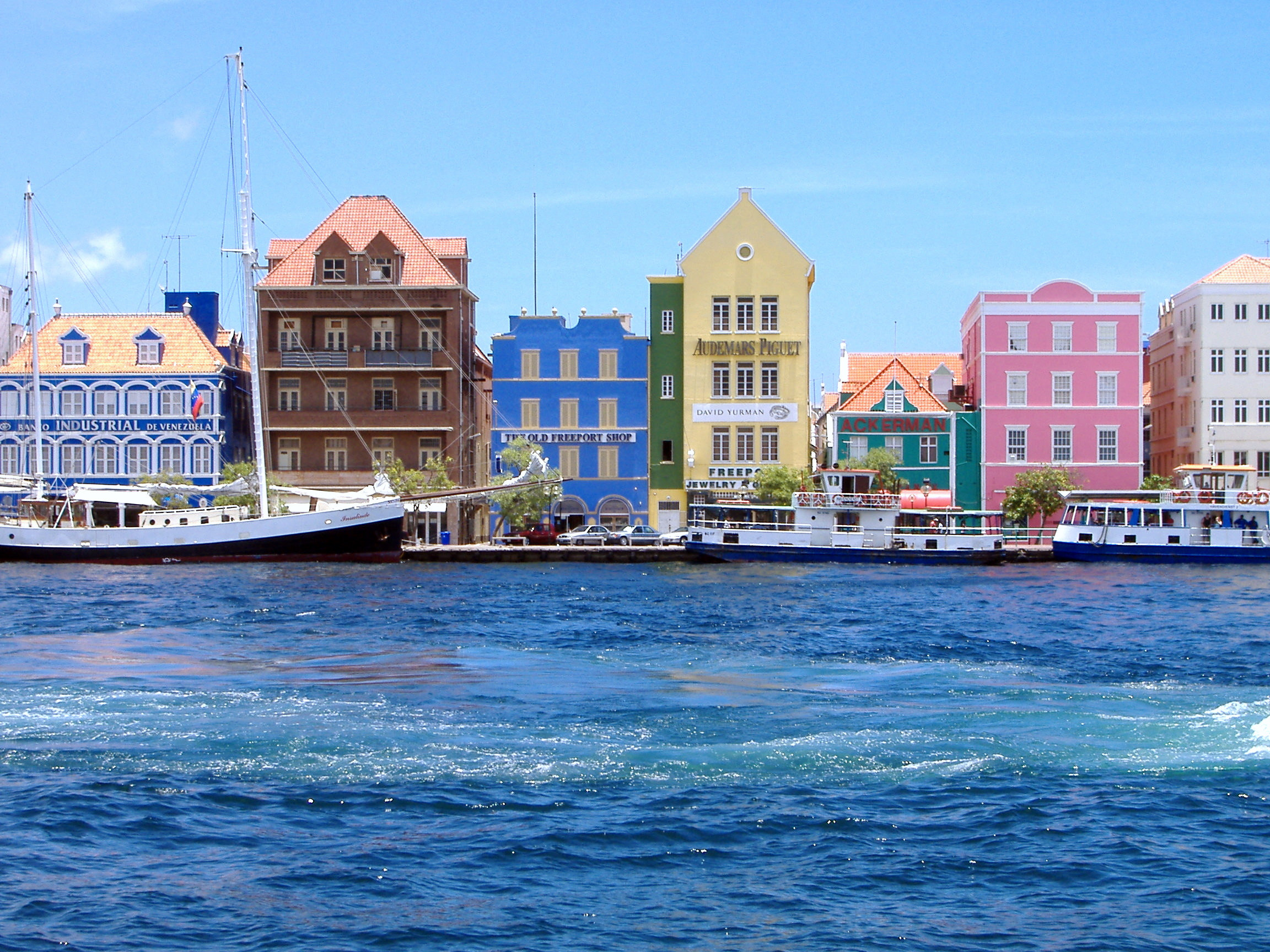
The harbour of Willemstad, capital of Curaçao.

This article presents a list of populated places in Curaçao. Curaçao is a Lesser Antilles island country in the southern Caribbean Sea and the Dutch Caribbean region, about 65 km (40 mi) north of the Venezuelan coast. It is a constituent country (Dutch: land) of the Kingdom of the Netherlands. The island is divided in three districts. The current division dates from 1930.

- Bandabou - North-west
  - Barber
  - Lagún
  - Sint Willibrordus
  - Soto
  - Tera Corá
  - Sabana Westpunt
  - Jan Donker
  - Daniel
- Bandariba - South-east
  - Oostpunt
  - Santa Rosa
  - Spaanse Water
- Willemstad - Capital city
  - Brievengat
  - Groot Kwartier (Emmastad)
  - Groot Piscadera (Julianadorp)
  - Hato
  - Koraal Partir
  - Otrobanda - historical quarter of Willemstad
  - Pietermaai - historical quarter of Willemstad
  - Piscadera Bay
  - Saliña
  - Scharloo - historical quarter of Willemstad
  - Sint Michiel
  - Steenrijk
