= Santa Barbara Beach, Curaçao =

Beach in Curaçao

Santa Barbara Beach
- Beach
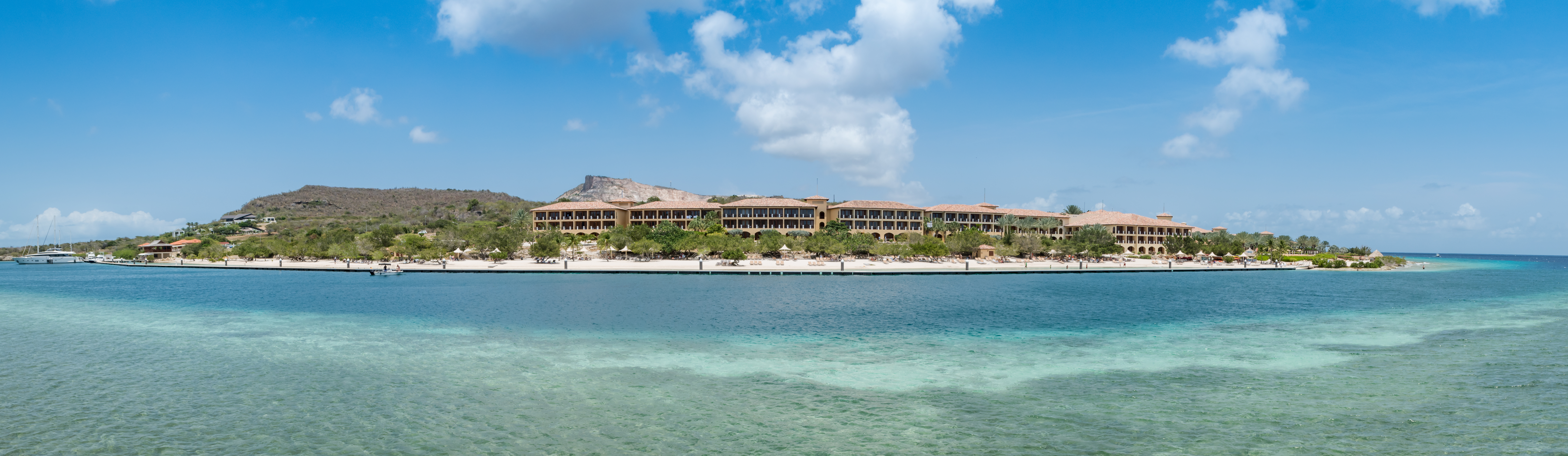

- Location in Curaçao
- Coordinates: 12°03′30″N 68°50′00″W
- Location: Santa Barbara, Curaçao

Santa Barbara Beach is a private beach on the Dutch Caribbean island of Curaçao, located at the southeast of island.

The terrain was the property of a mining company, close by an ancient phosphate mine that can still be found. The beach is accessible to the public paying an entrance fee of $15 per car. A landmark on the beach is Tafelberg. Close by is Curação Underwater Beach Park.

This beach is located at the south-east of the island and features views of the marina at Santa Barbara. In addition, the neighbourhood in which the beach is located, is in a gated community which features several amenities like a golf course, restaurants, ice cream shop, swimming pools, spa and the Sandals Royal Curaçao Resort.
