= Santa Rosa, Curaçao =

Santa Rosa
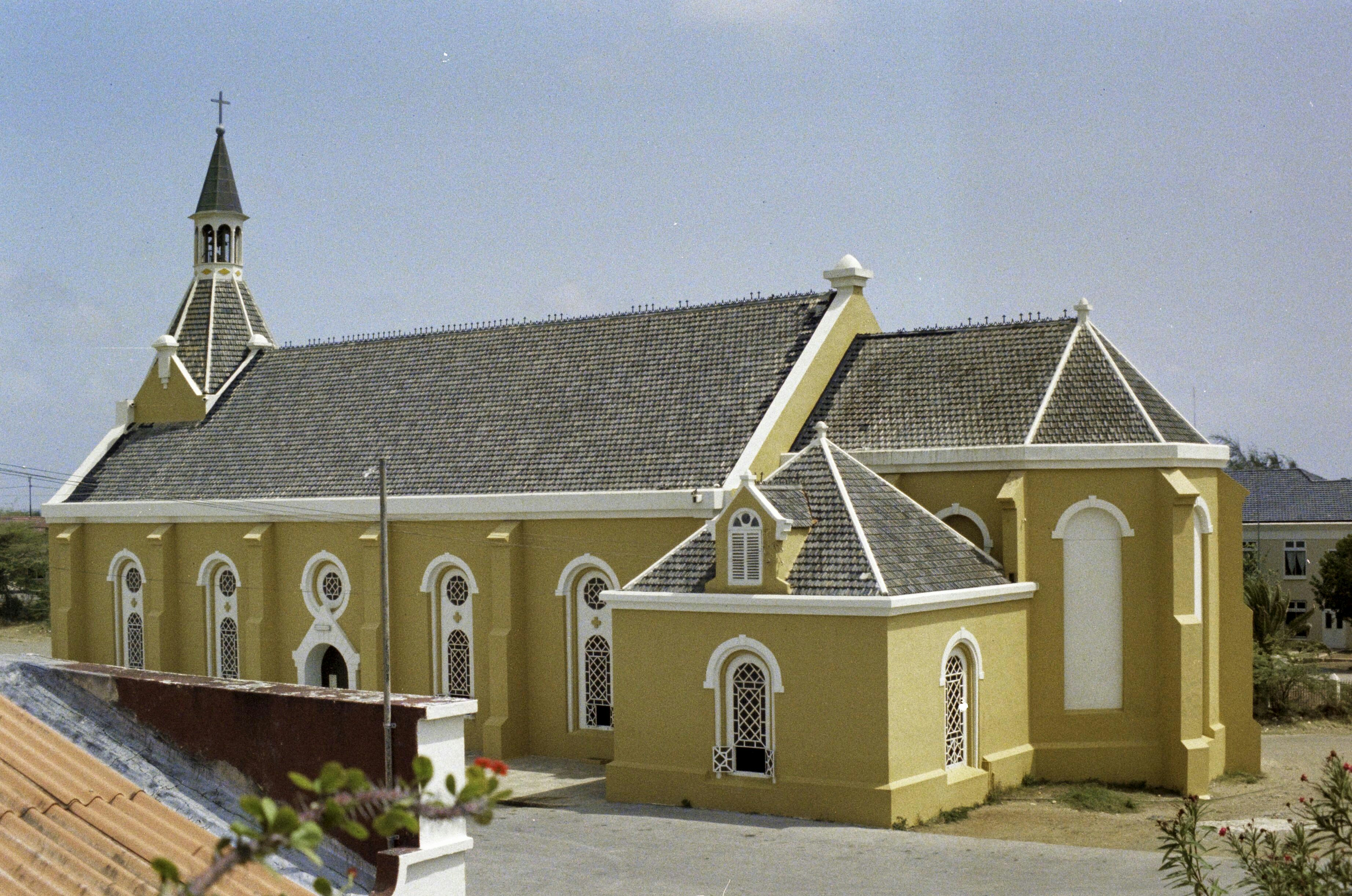
- Parish of Santa Rosa di Lima

- Location in Curaçao Santa Rosa (South America)
- Coordinates: 12.1169°N 68.8743°W
- State: Kingdom of the Netherlands
- Country: Curaçao
- District: Bandariba

Area
  - Total: 4.48 km^{2} (1.73 sq mi)

Population (2011)
  - Total: 5,198
  - Density: 1,160/km^{2} (3,010/sq mi)

Santa Rosa is a town on the island of Curaçao in the former Netherlands Antilles. It is to the east of the capital, Willemstad, located inland from the east coast, to the south of Santa Catarina, and is connected to the eastern coastline via a canal. To the southwest lies the settlement of Bapor Kibra, and to the southeast lies Nieuwpoort. The settlement of Santa Maria lies to the northwest.

== Overview ==
The area to the east of Willemstad was mainly settled by free and freed slaves. The area surrounding Santa Rosa contained 61 gardens owned by freed slaves, and 55 small plantations. The church of Santa Rosa was founded in 1839 by the Roman Catholic Church in order to educate and convert the former slave population. In 1885, an orphanage was built in the town.

It is a breeding ground for frigate birds, and is also the site of the CurAloe (Ecocity) plantation, a large Aloe vera plantation which offers daily tours to visitors.

== Notable people ==
- Luidjino Hoyer (born 1988), football player
- Jemyma Betrian (born 1991), mixed martial artist and kickboxer

== Bibliography ==
- Buurtprofiel Santa Rosa (2011). "Buurtprofiel Santa Rosa" (PDF). Government of Curaçao (in Dutch).
