= Johann Daniel Schumacher =

Johann Daniel Schumacher (Russian: Ива́н Дани́лович Шума́хер; German: Johann Daniel von Schumacher; 5 February 1690 – 14 June 1761) was the secretary of the Russian Academy of Sciences and director of the Library of the Russian Academy of Sciences, during the Russian Empire.

== Biography ==
Schumacher was born in Colmar in 1690. After studying philosophy at the University of Strasbourg, he became the tutor of the Count of Leiningen-Hartenburg. When he went with him to Paris, he met Pierre Lefort (1676-1754), a nephew of Peter the Great's admiral, who invited him to join him in Russia, where Peter the Great took him into service as a librarian. Some years later, in 1714, he became secretary of the department of medicine, and librarian of the Library of the Russian Academy of Sciences, which had opened in 1703. Peter the Great sent him to France, England, and the Netherlands in 1721, to invite scholars to settle in St. Petersbourg.

Laurentius Blumentrost (1692-1755), founder of the academy, made him secretary of the academy in 1724, putting him in charge of the new Academic Library and the Kunstkamera. Meanwhile, a certain number of scholars, among them Bilfinger and Bernoulli, arrived at St Petersburg. Over the years, some scholars, like Bernoulli, left the academy, accusing Schumacher of despotism. Suffering from Schumacher’s persecutions, Müller was forced to go to Siberia in 1732, where he stayed until 1743. A formal complaint was carried before the academy's senate, charging him with authoritarianism and misappropriation of funds. However, he was only found guilty of the misappropriation of the alcohol stores of the academy. Following this, he set up a printing house linked to the Academy, dealing with the liberal arts and mechanics.

In 1730, Schumacher began a lengthy correspondence with Leonhard Euler, then at the academy. The correspondence continued until 1757, long after Euler had left for Berlin, and eventually comprised over three hundred letters in total. They shared scientific news and Euler advised Schumacher on suitable candidates for vacancies at the academy, as well as sending scientific equipment and his own latest publications.

The second president of the academy, Baron Johann Albrecht von Korff, ignoring the observation of the academic Louis de l'Isle on "... the disadvantage caused to the Academy by the dependence of the Academy from the chancellery ...", made Schumacher his counselor, putting him in charge of the academy’s accounts. Following a complaint by the academic Andrey Nartov regarding the Academy’s expenses (to the tune of 109 rubles), Schumacher was suspended from office and placed under house arrest on 7 October 1742. In the end, a commission under Prince Boris Youssoupov cleared him of all charges, and he was reinstituted into all his positions in 1746.

Under his guidance, the first catalogue of the books of the Academy was published (1742-1747), as well as a catalogue of the exhibits titled Musei imperialis petropolitani (1741-1745). His correspondences with Kirillov, Blumentrost and others was published in 1866 by Piotr Pekarski (1828-1872). In 1750 he was made a state counselor. Having grown senile, he was pensioned off in 1757 and died in 1761 at Saint Petersburg.

He was married to Anna Dorothea von Velten, daughter of Johann Velten, head cook of Peter the Great. Empress Elisabeth gave him the estate of Unipiha on 4 October 1759. His widow remained in possession of the estate until 1768. His daughter, Eleonora Dorothea, was married twice, first 1750 to Johann Casper Taubert and after his death, to Petr Stupishin (1718–1782). His other daughter, Anna Dorothea von Schumacher (1730-1801), was married twice, first to Johann VII Burchard von Béllawary, then to Johann Amman.

== Bibliography ==
• Gabriel Braeuner, « Jean Daniel Schumacher », in Nouveau dictionnaire de biographie alsacienne, vol. 34, p. 3554

• (ru) Article biographique de l'Encyclopédie Brockhaus et Efron (1890-1907)

• Geschichte deer Stadt Colmar und der umliegenden Gegend (pages-250-251), Théodore-François-Xavier Hunkle, 1838

• De Kunstkamera (pages 173-175), Peter de Grote, Uitgeverij Verloren, 2006

== Sources ==
• Rostislav de Kotzebue: History and genealogy of the Kotzebue Family, éditions Her-vas, Paris, 1984

• L. von Stryk: Beiträge zur Geschichte der Rittergüter Livlands, volume 1, H. v. Hirschheydt, 1969

• (ru) This article is drawn primarily from the correspondent Russian and French articles, but also indebted to the German article
