= List of populated places in the Caribbean =

Largest cities, towns, and villages by country in the Caribbean region

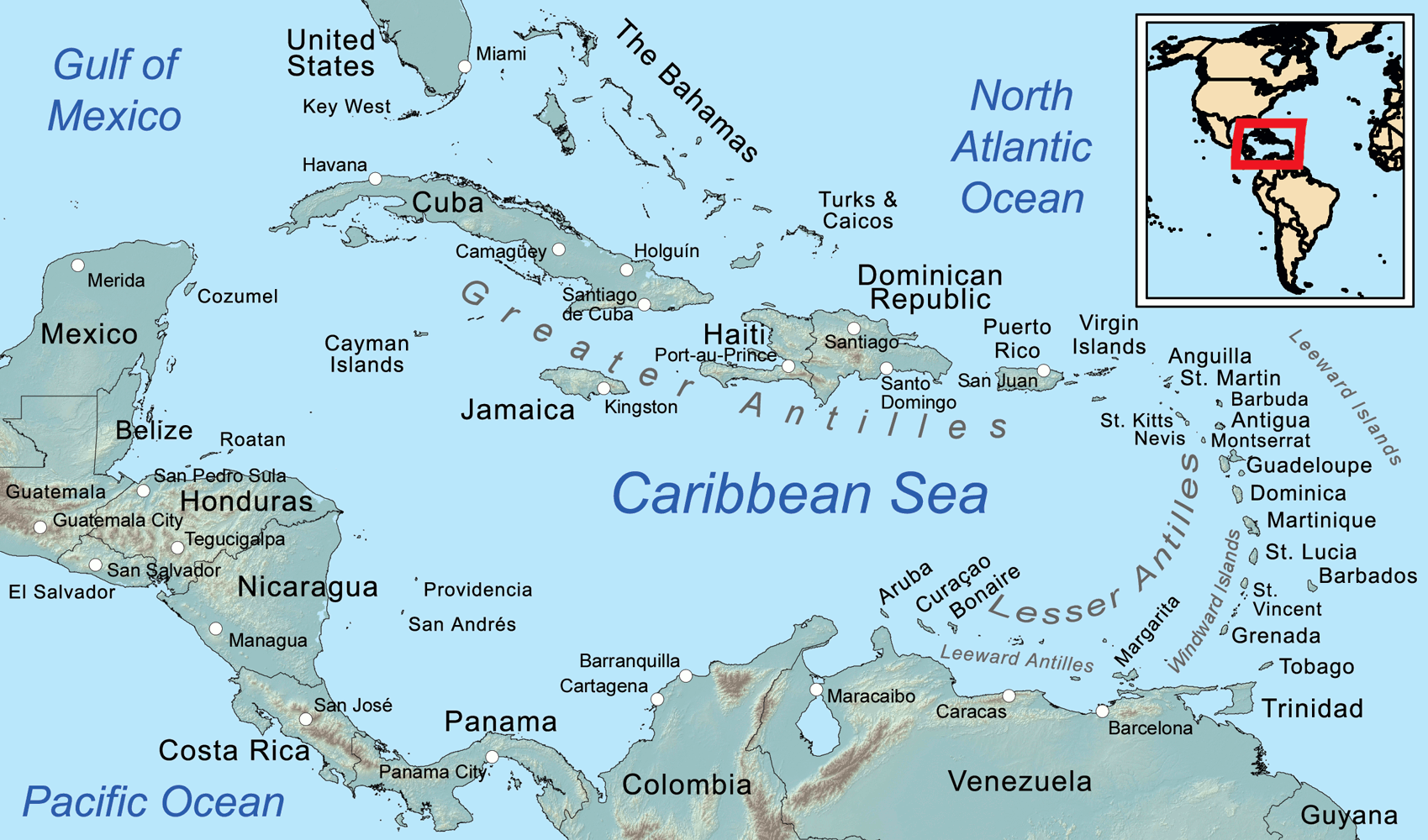
The Caribbean region

This is a list of populated places in the Caribbean. Only the major metropolitan areas and largest populated or significant places in each country, national region/district, or national territory are listed. In most cases, the largest populated place for a given country, national region, or territory is the capital city.

== Largest populated places ==
List of largest populated places by country/region/territory in the Caribbean
Link to list of cities by country, region, or territory	Populated place	Population	Year	Refs
Anguilla (British Overseas Territory)	The Valley	2,035	2010	
Antigua and Barbuda (Commonwealth realm)	Saint John's	24,226	2010	
Aruba (Constituent state of the Kingdom of the Netherlands)	Oranjestad	29,998	2010	
Bahamas (Commonwealth Realm)	Nassau	227,940	2010	
Barbados	Bridgetown	98,511	2010	
Belize (Commonwealth Realm)	Belize City (Note: Not the capital of the country)	61,461	2010	
Bonaire (special municipality of the Netherlands)	Kralendijk	10,620	2017	
British Virgin Islands (British Overseas Territory)	Road Town	8,449	2010	
Cayman Islands (British Overseas Territory)	George Town (Note: George Town is the largest city by population of the British Overseas Territories)	40,200	2019	
Cuba	Havana	2,117,625	2015	
Curaçao (Constituent state of the Kingdom of the Netherlands)	Willemstad	136,660	2011	
Dominica	Roseau	14,725	2011	
Dominican Republic	Santo Domingo	3,658,648	2015	
Grenada (Commonwealth Realm)	St. George's	33,734	2012	
Guadeloupe (overseas department/region and single territorial collectivity of France)	Pointe-à-Pitre	132,884	2013	
Haiti	Port-au-Prince	2,618,894	2015	
Jamaica (Commonwealth Realm)	Kingston	1,190,763	2015	
Martinique (overseas department/region and single territorial collectivity of France)	Fort-de-France	78,126	2013	
Montserrat (British Overseas Territory)	Brades	1,000	1998	
Nueva Esparta (a Venezuelan state)	Porlamar	144,830	2011	
Puerto Rico (Territory of the United States)	San Juan metropolitan area	2,196,538	2015	
Saba (special municipality of the Netherlands)	The Bottom	462	2001	
San Andrés and Providencia (Colombian department)	San Andrés	55,426	2005	
Saint Barthélemy (Dependent Territory of France)	Gustavia	2,300	2017	
Saint Kitts and Nevis (Commonwealth Realm)	Basseterre	14,000	2018	
Saint Lucia (Commonwealth Realm)	Castries	20,000	2010	
Saint Martin (Dependent Territory of France)	Marigot	5,700	2006	
Saint Vincent and the Grenadines (Commonwealth Realm)	Kingstown	12,909	2012	
Sint Maarten (Constituent state of the Kingdom of the Netherlands)	Philipsburg	1,894	2017	
Sint Eustatius (special municipality of the Netherlands)	Oranjestad	1,038	2001	
Trinidad and Tobago	Chaguanas	83,489	2011	
Turks and Caicos Islands (British Overseas Territory)	Providenciales	23,769	2012	
United States Virgin Islands (Territory of the United States)	Charlotte Amalie	18,481	2010	

== Map of places ==
Largest populated places in Caribbean countries
Caribbean region, click on Interactive Map to browse region with ordered list of places by population

== Cities in other nearby countries ==
- List of cities in Bermuda
- List of cities in Colombia
- List of cities in French Guiana
- List of cities in Guyana
- List of cities in Suriname
- List of cities in Venezuela
- List of cities in Nicaragua
- List of cities in Panama

== See also ==
- List of Caribbean countries by population
- List of metropolitan areas in the West Indies
- List of national capitals by population
- List of sovereign states and dependent territories in the West Indies
