= Laurentius Blumentrost =

Russian court physician (1692–1755)

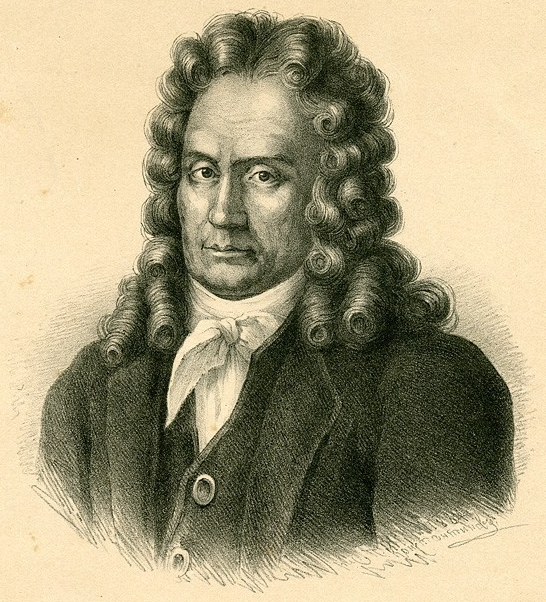
- Born: November 8, 1692; Moscow, Russia
- Died: March 27, 1755 (aged 62)
- Education: Leiden University
- Occupation: Physician
- Scientific career
- Workplaces: Fellow of the Saint Petersburg Academy of Sciences
- Doctoral advisor: Herman Boerhaave

Laurentius Blumentrost (Russian: Лаврентий Лаврентьевич Блументрост, romanized: Lavrenty Lavrentyevich Blumentrost; November 8 [O.S. October 29] 1692 – 27 March 1755) was a Russian physician who became the personal physician to Peter the Great. He was also the founder and the first president of the St. Petersburg Academy of Sciences, from December 7, 1725, to June 6, 1733.

== Biography ==
Blumentrost was born in Moscow on November 8 [O.S. October 29] 1692. His father, Laurentius Blumentrost the Elder, a man of German origin, was the personal physician to Tsar Alexis of Russia. Laurentius taught his son Latin and Greek, He later studied under Justus Samuel Scharschmidt and at Pastor Glück's Lutheran school in the German settlement in Moscow. In 1706, he began to attend university at Halle, then Oxford, and finally Leiden, where he studied under Herman Boerhaave, defended his thesis, De secretione animali, in 1713 and received a medical degree in 1714. In 1716 a pharmacopoea titled Blumentrost's house and travel apothek was published by the physician Johann Georg Hoyer who wrote in the preface that Blumentrost was driven not by honor and money to serve in Russia but answering a divine call to duty.

== Court physician ==
On his return to Russia, Blumentrost was appointed personal physician to Princess Natalia, Tsar Alexis's daughter and Tsar Peter the Great's sister. He continued his studies in Paris and Amsterdam (with Frederik Ruysch, from whom he bought anatomical specimens on behalf of the Russian government for the Kunstkamera). After his return to St. Petersburg, Peter the Great sent him to the Olonets Governorate to study the Marcial mineral springs in Kondopozhsky District.

When Robert Erskine, the Tsar's Scottish-born personal physician, died in 1718, Blumentrost was appointed to the position. He kept Johann Daniel Schumacher, Erskine's assistant who had studied at the University of Strasbourg and had been in charge of the Imperial Library and the Kunstkamera under Erskine, on as his secretary.

== Academy of Sciences ==
In 1724, on the Tsar's orders, he founded the Saint Petersburg Academy of Sciences. The first session was held after Peter's death, on November 12, 1725, and it opened officially in December with Blumentrost as its first president. Most of the members were recruited abroad; with the assistance of the philosopher Christian Wolff, he successfully invited the Bernoulli brothers Nicholas and Daniel, Christian Goldbach, physician Georg Bilfinger, astronomer and geographer Louis de l'Isle de la Croyère, and historian Gerhard Müller, among others. In 1727 Leonhard Euler joined the academy at Blumentrost's invitation in a letter sent via Daniel Bernoulli.

He remained president of the academy under Empress Catherine I; when she was succeeded by Peter II, he followed the court to Moscow in 1728, after signing an order under which Schumacher was left in charge of the academy, with three academicians appointed to 4-month terms as his deputies. This led to discord among the members. After the Tsar's death, Blumentrost lost his influence. Nicolaas Bidloo did not approve of his treatment methods and he did not dare appear before the new Empress, Anna. He remained president of the academy until 1733 and returned to St. Petersburg, where he lived in the palace of the Empress' sister, Catherine Ivanovna, Duchess of Mecklenburg.

== Retirement and death ==
The Duchess of Mecklenburg died on June 14, 1733. The Empress ordered an investigation of Blumentrost; no fault was found on his part, but by 19 June he had been stripped of his positions and income and expelled from St. Petersburg. For a few years he lived in Moscow and had a private medical practice. In 1738, under the patronage of archiater Johann Bernhard Fischer, he became head physician at the Moscow military hospital and director of the hospital school. Empress Anna did not trust Blumentrost, mainly because of his devotion to the two daughters of Peter the Great and Catherine, Anna and Elizabeth. When Elizabeth became Empress, he came back into royal favour. She reinstated his rank of State Councillor and raised his salary. In 1754 he was appointed curator of the newly opened University of Moscow.

Blumentrost died in St. Petersburg on 27 March 1755 of hydrothorax. He is buried at the church of St. Sampson the Hospitable, now Saint Sampson's Cathedral.

Blumentrost's brothers Ivan (Johannes Deodatus or Johann Deodat; 1676–1756) and Christian were also court physicians. Ivan was also personal physician to Peter I (and his field physician and archiater) and had also studied in Halle and Leiden. He fell out of favour under Empress Anna and died in poverty in 1756; he is buried in the same grave as Laurentius.

== Sources ==
- "Блументрост, Лаврентий Лаврентьевич" . Brockhaus and Efron Encyclopedic Dictionary (in Russian). 1906.
