= Chairon Isenia =

Dutch baseball player (born 1979)

- Catcher
- Born: 23 January 1979 (age 47); Sint Joris, Curaçao
- Bats: Right Throws: Right
Medals
Men's baseball
Representing Netherlands
European Baseball Championship
Gold medal – first place	2003 Netherlands	National team

Chairon Ramon Isenia (born 23 January 1979) is a Curaçaoan former baseball player who is a scout for the Tampa Bay Rays. He played for the Netherlands national team in two Summer Olympics and the 2006 World Baseball Classic (WBC) and for Tampa Bay in the minor leagues as a catcher.

== Playing career ==
Isenia played for the Netherlands at the 2000 Summer Olympics in Sydney, where the team finished fifth. He batted 0-for-3 as the backup catcher to Johnny Balentina. Four years later at the 2004 Summer Olympics in Athens, the Dutch were sixth. Isenia had a .353 batting average in Athens, leading the Dutch and ninth best in the tournament. He also played for the Netherlands in the 2006 WBC, batting 1-for-3. In other international tournaments, he was named to the All-Star team of the 2003 European Baseball Championship after batting .350, then hit .308 at the 2003 Baseball World Cup.

Isenia signed with the Tampa Bay Devil Rays in April 1996 for a $22,500 signing bonus. He played in the minor leagues from 1996 to 2006, playing in Double-A his final four seasons. He was a New York–Penn League All-Star in 1999. In 2004, he batted .304 for the Montgomery Biscuits, missing part of the minor league season to compete in the Olympics. Isenia suffered a concussion after a home plate collision with Cory Aldridge in August 2006, ending his final professional season on the disabled list. Isenia retired the following April.

== Personal life ==
After his playing career, Isenia has been a scout in Curaçao, working for the New York Yankees in 2010 and later the Tampa Bay Rays. He has also organized youth baseball programs in Curaçao.

Isenia was nicknamed "Shaggy" while playing with the Rays. He was a barber for his teammates and speaks five languages.

Isenia's older brother, Percy Isenia, played for the Dutch baseball team in the 2006 WBC and 2000 and 2008 Summer Olympics. Percy was a first baseman in the Honkbal Hoofdklasse and later managed the Netherlands women's national baseball team in two Women's Baseball World Cup tournaments.
