= Wacław Mayzel =

Polish histologist

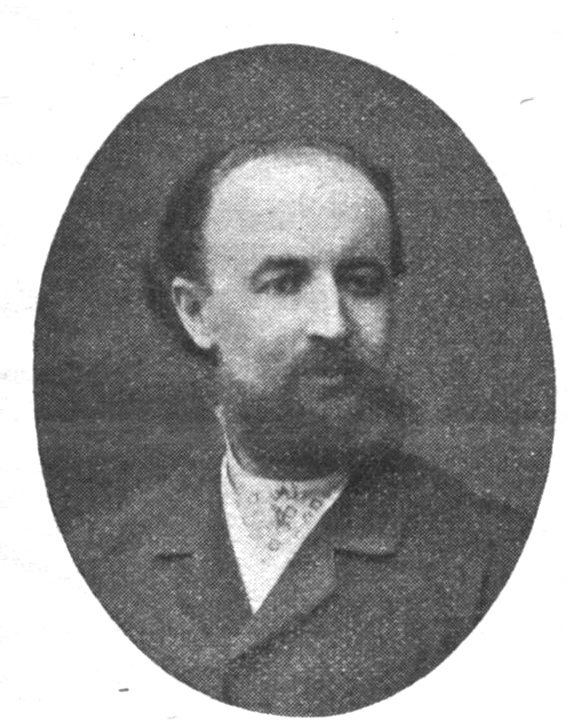
- Born: 12 September 1847; Kunów, Poland
- Died: 19 April 1916 (aged 68); Warsaw, Poland
- Resting place: Powązki Cemetery
- Scientific career
- Fields: Histology

Wacław Mayzel (12 September 1847 – 19 April 1916) was a Polish histologist and the first to describe mitosis in 1874 while studying epithelial growth in frogs, rabbits and cats. He was also involved in popularizing evolutionary thinking by translating Darwin's On the Origin of Species into Polish in 1873.

== Biography ==
Wacław Mayzel was born on 12 September 1847 to Józef and Rozalia (Minheymer) Mayzel, in Kunów, Ostrowiec County, Poland. Having graduated St Ann's secondary school in Kraków in 1865, he enrolled at the Faculty of Medicine in the Warsaw General School. Five years later, Mayzel earned a doctorate in the field. During his time as a student, and while working at Henryk Fryderyk Hoyer's Institute of Histology and Physiology, he wrote a paper titled Poszukiwania nad powstawaniem ropy (Exploring the formation of pus), critically acclaimed by his faculty. In it, Mayzel discusses Cohnheim's claims that during inflammation, leukocytes exit blood vessels and take part in the formation of pus.

After receiving a diploma cum eximia laude in 1870, Mayzel took up a position of a lab assistant in Hoyer's Histology and Embryology faculty, instructing students in microscope usage, and conducting his own research. While observing epithelium regeneration, he noticed that nuclei of some of the newly formed cells feature unknown to him grains and fibers. He then, in 1874, informed the Warsaw Medical Association about his research so as to be credited in case an important discovery is made. Eduard Strasburger and Otto Bütschli's work, published the following year, convinced Mayzel that his observations are related to the division of the nucleus, and so he presented them in a paper titled Ueber eigenthümliche Vorgänge bei der Theilung der Kerne in Epithelialzellen or O szczególnych zjawiskach przy dzieleniu się jąder w komórkach nabłonkowych (On peculiar occurrences during the division of nuclei in epithelium cells).

In the following years, Mayzel continued his research and published more papers, sometimes illustrating them on his own. He made observations on mitosis in living cells, including the order of changes that happen during the division, noticed an analogy in impregnation and early development of animal and plant cells, and spoke against the idea of karyolysis. He presented his research to a wider public during various medical conferences in Kraków, Berlin, Prague, Paris, London, Rome, and Madrid.

Apart from the work related to mitosis, Mayzel took up educational and humanitarian activities. As a hygienist and bacteriologist, he helped set up waterworks and a sewerage system in Warsaw, and published numerous papers on microscopic water analysis. Despite not centering his career on therapeutics, Mayzel showed interest in parasitology, tuberculosis research, and medical analysis, and temporarily worked in a clinic in Warsaw. Among his interests was also urology, particularly urine analysis; in 1894, during a medical conference in Rome, he presented his own method of detecting uric acid in urine. Mayzel translated or helped translate about a dozen works into the Polish language, including Charles Darwin's On the Origin of Species.

== Personal life ==
Wacław Mayzel was married to Bronisława Mayzel (Kleszczyńska), and had a daughter Zofia Guźkowska (Mayzel).

== Selected works ==
- Poszukiwania nad powstawaniem ropy (Klinika, 1869)
- O powstawaniu gatunków drogą naturalnego doboru czyli O utrzymywaniu się doskonalszych ras istot organicznych w walce o byt Part 1 Part 2 (1873)
- Ueber eigenthümliche Vorgänge bei der Theilung der Kerne in Epithelialzellen (Zentralblatt für die Medizinischen Wissenschaften, 1875)
- O szczególnych zjawiskach przy dzieleniu się jąder w komórkach nabłonkowych (Medycyna, 1875)
- Przyczynek do sprawy dzielenia się jąder komórkowych (Gazeta Lekarska, 1876)
- Dalszy przyczynek do sprawy dzielenia się jąder komórkowych (Gazeta Lekarska, 1877)
- O pierwszych zmianach w jajku zapłodnionem i o podziale komórek (Pamphlet Towarzystwa Lekarskiego Warszawskiego, 1878)
- O zjawiskach przy segmentacji jajek robaków (Nematoda) i ślimaków (Gazeta Lekarska, 1879)
- O karyomitozie (Księga pamiątkowa prof. Hoyera, 1884)
- Wskazówki do rozbioru moczu (Rocznik Lekarski, 1890)
