= Bandariba =

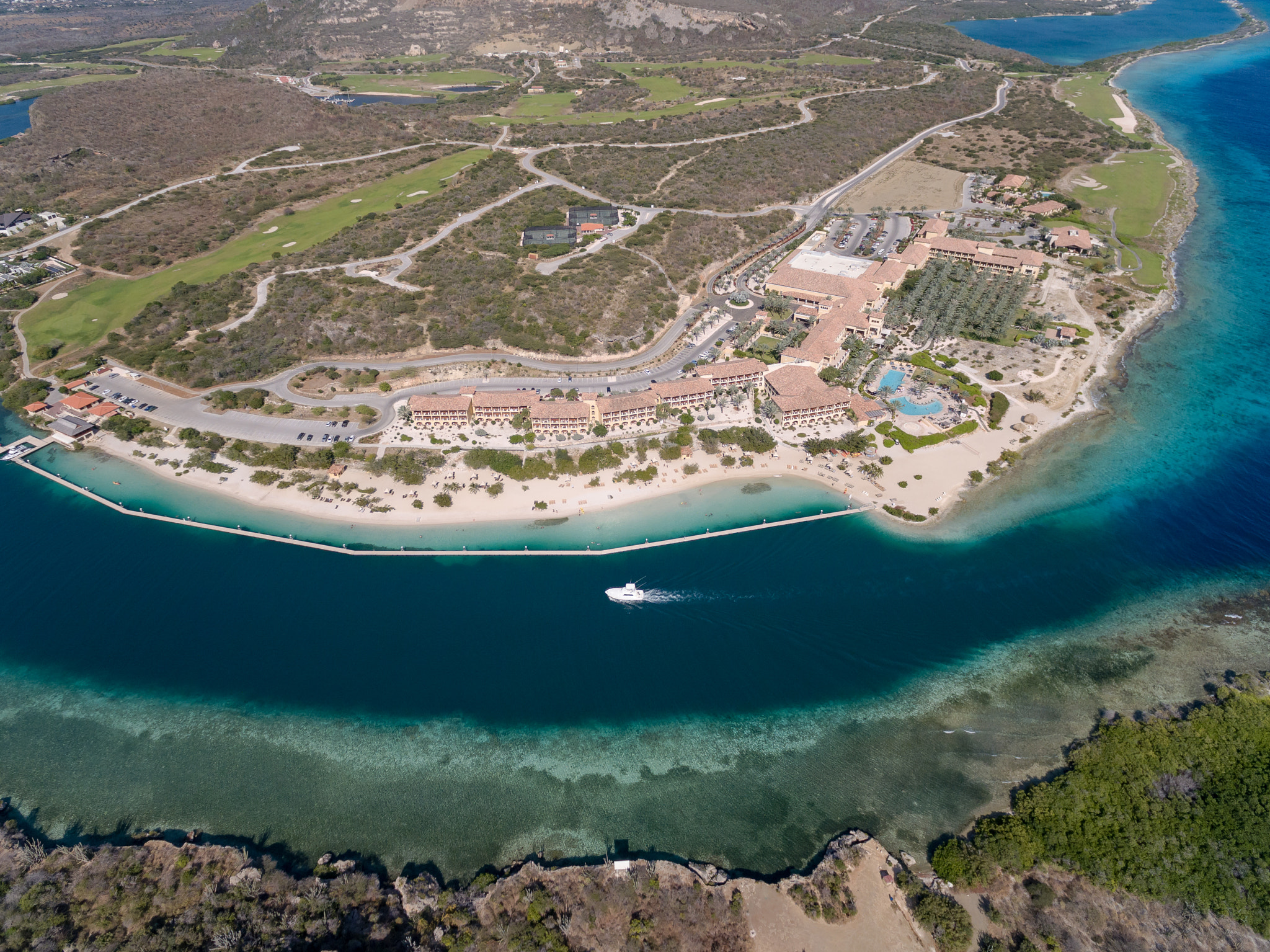
- Aerial view of Santa Barbara

- Location within Curaçao
- Coordinates: 12.0932°N 68.8317°W
- State: Kingdom of the Netherlands
- Country: Curaçao

Population (2011)
  - Total: 20,838
- Climate: BSh

Bandariba (also: Banda'riba) is a district of the island of Curaçao. It is one of the three districts and encompasses the south-eastern part of the island. The name is Papiamentu and translates to "upside". The district contains the towns and villages of Santa Rosa, Spaanse Water, Montaña, Seru Grandi, and Oostpunt.

== History ==
In 1634, Curaçao was conquered by the Dutch West Indies Company, and the city of Punda was founded. In order to feed the population, plantations were established on the island. The plantations were small-scale due to the infertile ground and produced yams, mangos, oranges, or raised livestock. Bandariba later attracted free and freed slaves who settled in the vacant land.

In the 19th century, the Roman Catholic church founded the villages of Santa Rose and Montaña in order to educate and convert the former slave population. In 1875, a large-scale phosphate mine was opened near the Tafelberg, In 1927, Royal Dutch Shell built an oil terminal at Spaanse Water.

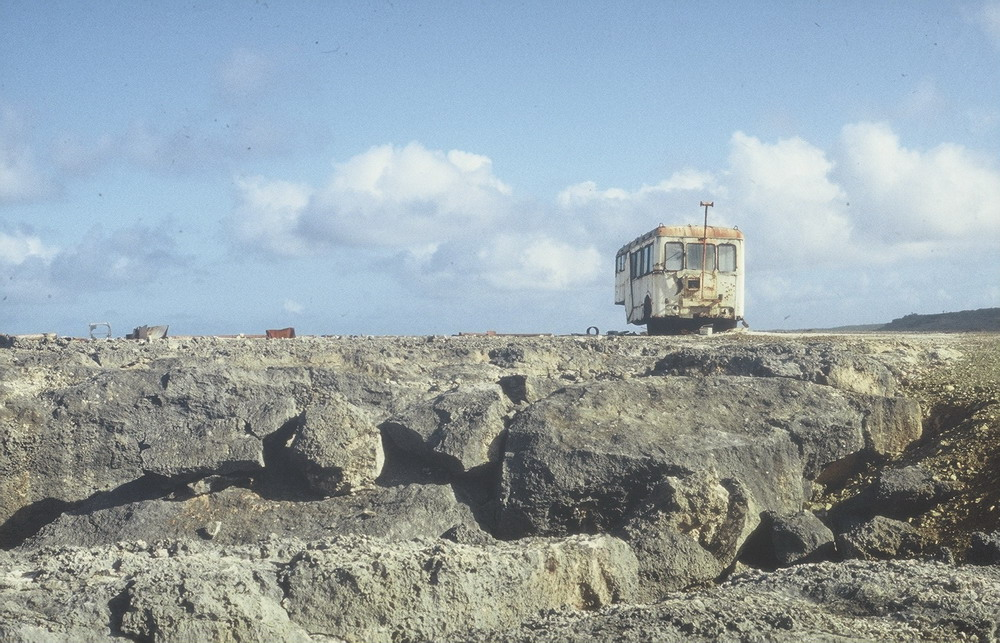
Oostpunt

The current division of the island dates from 1930 when Willemstad was extended to include most of the suburbs. During the late 20th century, tourism became important and Bandariba saw the development of tourist resorts.

The village of Oostpunt, the most eastern point of the island, is private property of the Maal family, and most of the 54 square kilometres (21 sq mi) area surrounding the villages of Oostpunt, Sint Joris, and Santa Catharina is off limits. The village of Oostpunt is only inhabited by Willy Maal and his mother. Oostpunt covers about 10% of the island.

== Villages ==
- Montaña Abou
- Montaña Rey
- Nieuwpoort
- Oostpunt
- Santa Barbara
- Santa Rosa
- Seru Grandi
- Spaanse Water

== Bibliography ==
- "Buurtprofiel Oostpunt" (PDF). Government of Curaçao (in Dutch). 2011. p. 6.
