= Josefstadt =

Coordinates: 48°12′39″N 16°20′53″E

Josefstadt Josefstod (Bavarian)
- 8th District of Vienna
- Coat of arms

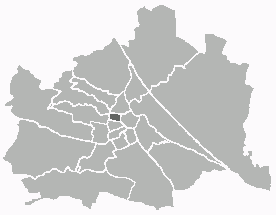
- Location of the district within Vienna
- Country: Austria
- City: Vienna

Government
  - District Director: Martin Fabisch (The Greens)
  - First Deputy: Lena Köhler (The Greens)
  - Second Deputy: Alexander Spritzendorfer (Green)
  - Representation (40 Members): The Greens 18, SPÖ 7,ÖVP 6, FPÖ 3, NEOS 4, KPÖ 2

Area
  - Total: 1.08 km^{2} (0.42 sq mi)

Population (2016-01-01)
  - Total: 25,068
  - Density: 23,200/km^{2} (60,100/sq mi)
- Postal code: 1080
- Address of District Office: Schlesingerplatz 4; 1080 Wien and Wipplingerstraße 8; 1010 Wien
- Website: www.wien.gv.at/bezirke/josefstadt/

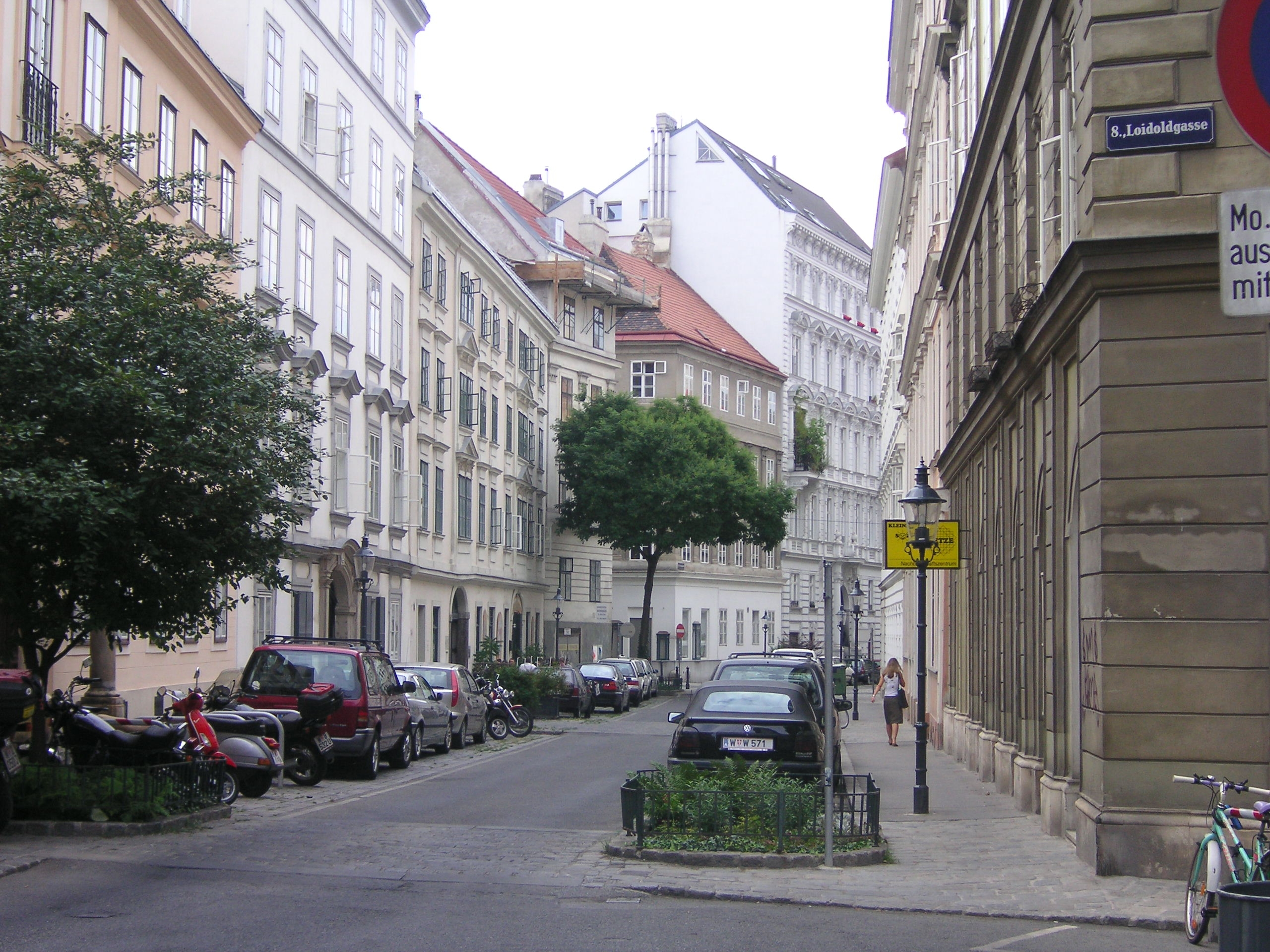
A typical residential area quite close to the city centre. The street pictured here, Lenaugasse, is named after Nikolaus Lenau.

Piaristenkirche or Maria-Treu-Kirche (church) in Josefstadt.

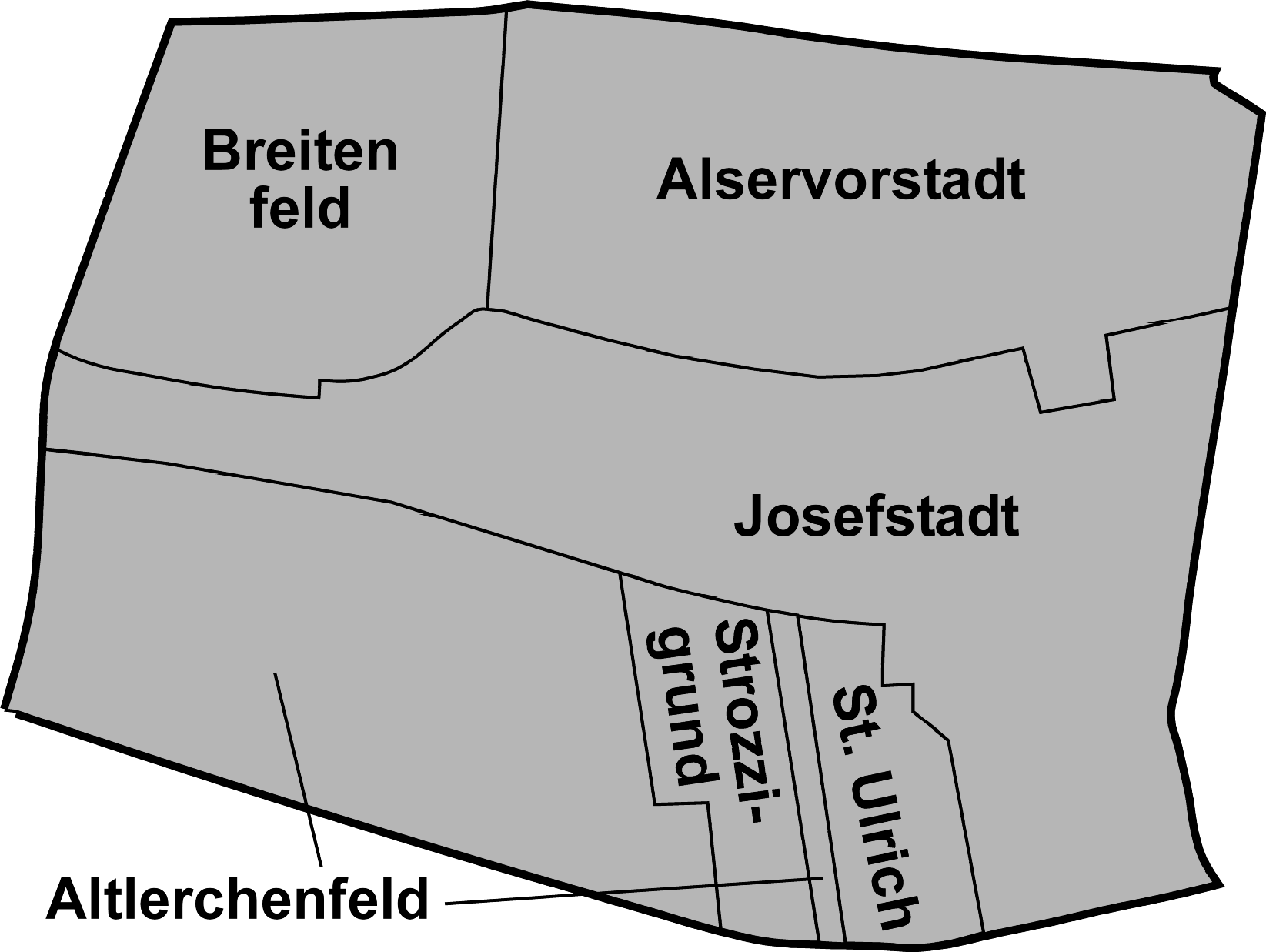
District sections of Josefstadt.

Josefstadt (German pronunciation: [ˈjoːzɛfˌʃtat]; Viennese: Josefstod; "Joseph-Town") is the eighth district of Vienna (German: 8. Bezirk, Josefstadt). It is near the center of Vienna and was established as a district in 1850, but borders changed later. Josefstadt is a heavily populated urban area with many workers and residential homes. It has a population of 24,279 people (2014). With an area of 1.08 km^{2} (.42 sq.mi.), Josefstadt is the smallest district in Vienna, and was named after the Holy Roman Emperor Joseph I.

It consists of the former Vorstädte of Josefstadt, Breitenfeld, Strozzigrund, and Alt-Lerchenfeld, as well as parts of St. Ulrich and Alservorstadt. The district borders are formed by Alser Straße (north), Lerchenfelderstraße (south), Hernalsergürtel and Lerchenfeldergürtel in the west, and Auerspergstraße and Landesgerichtsstraße in the east.

Josefstadt has developed into a middle-class neighbourhood. Most mayors of Vienna have lived here, as does Austria's former president. Due to its proximity to the University of Vienna, Josefstadt is also the home of many students.

On the basis of the 2005 municipal elections, Josefstadt became Vienna's second district ever (after Neubau) to have a Green district director.

== Geography ==
Josefstadt is located in the center of the city of Vienna. Covering an area of 1.08 km^{2}, it is the smallest district of Vienna, where Josefstadt occupies only 0.26% of the area of Vienna. The district lies between the Vienna belt and the so-called two-line, and it is one of the most densely built districts of Vienna. Only 2% of the district area are parks.

== Topography ==
The Josefstadt district lies on a plateau between two streams now channeled Wienerwald, with Josefstadt not quite where the streams can reach. The Alser Bach (now led under the Lazarettgasse) and the Ottakringer Bach (today between Lerchenfelder Street and Neustiftgasse), before the construction, had dug deep valleys with a partially strong gap in the area, resulting in significant differences in height within the district areas. The western border on Lerchenfelder belt lies at an altitude of 204.5 meters, while on the eastern edge of the district, the Friedrich-Schmidt Square reached a height of 180 meters. Also, between the north and south of the county area, there are differences in altitude. Thus, the intersection Kochgasse/Alserstraße, in the north, reached to 185 meters in height, the plateau Florianigasse-Skodagasse to 198 meters in height, and the intersection of Lerchenfelder Street with Kaiserstrasse (in the south) to 196 meters in height.

== District sections ==
Josefstadt was formed from the former suburbs Altlerchenfeld, Breitenfeld, Josef city and Strozzigrund. Added to this was the proportion of the Alser southern suburb and a small part of St. Ulrich. In the northeast area of the district, between High Street and Florianigasse and Feldgasse, lies Alservorstadt (suburbs), where the northern part of the district is called Alsergrund. In parts, the Alservorstadt section includes the Municipal District, the Regional Court, the Museum for Ethnology, as well as the largest park in the district, the Schoenborn Park. In the north-west of the district, Breitenfelder Kirche (church) lies between the belts Florianigasse and Feldgasse of Breitenfeld. The north of the Josefstädter Street and the southeastern area of the territory belongs to the sub-district Josefstadt. The most important buildings are the Theater of Josefstadt and the church Piaristenkirche "Maria Treu." Around Strozzigasse, there is the small district-section Strozzigrund, with the tax office. Included is the Strozzigrund in the west and east of Altlerchenfeld, where in the Pfeilgasse, several student residences are located. In the southeast area of the district, in the southern area of Piaristengasse, a small part of St. Ulrich is located, whose largest part is located in the adjacent district Neubau.

A breakdown of the district area is also in the Zählbezirken of official statistics, in which the district census of each municipality are combined. The three Zählbezirke in Josefstadt are Laudongasse, Josefstädter Straße (street) and Bennoplatz.

== Politics ==
District directors since 1945
Egon Schiska (KPÖ)	4/1945-7/1945
Gustav Lorant (ÖVP)	7/1945-11/1945
Richard Honetz (ÖVP)	1945–1946
Hans Preyer (ÖVP)	1946–1950
Alexander Riedl (ÖVP)	1950–1954
Franz Bartl (ÖVP)	1954–1959
Marie Franc (ÖVP)	1959–1964
Walter Kasparek (ÖVP)	1964–1980
Ludwig Zerzan (ÖVP)	1990–1994
Franz Neubauer (ÖVP)	1994–1998
Margit Kostal (ÖVP)	1998–2005
Heribert Rahdjian (Green, later ECHT)	2005-2010
Veronika Mickel-Göttfert (ÖVP)	2010–

== Notable residents ==
- Johann Lukas von Hildebrandt
- Anton Wildgans
- Karl von Frisch
- Heinz Fischer
- Kurt Gödel
- Marie von Ebner-Eschenbach
- Ödön von Horvath
- Milo Dor
- H. C. Artmann
- Ignaz Semmelweis
- Johann Adam Hoyer

== In popular culture ==
The 2007 ORF comedy drama series Mitten im 8en ("In the middle of the 8th") was set in Josefstadt, with the title referencing to it being the 8th district of Vienna.
