= Christoffelberg =

Mountain in Curaçao

- Mt Christoffel
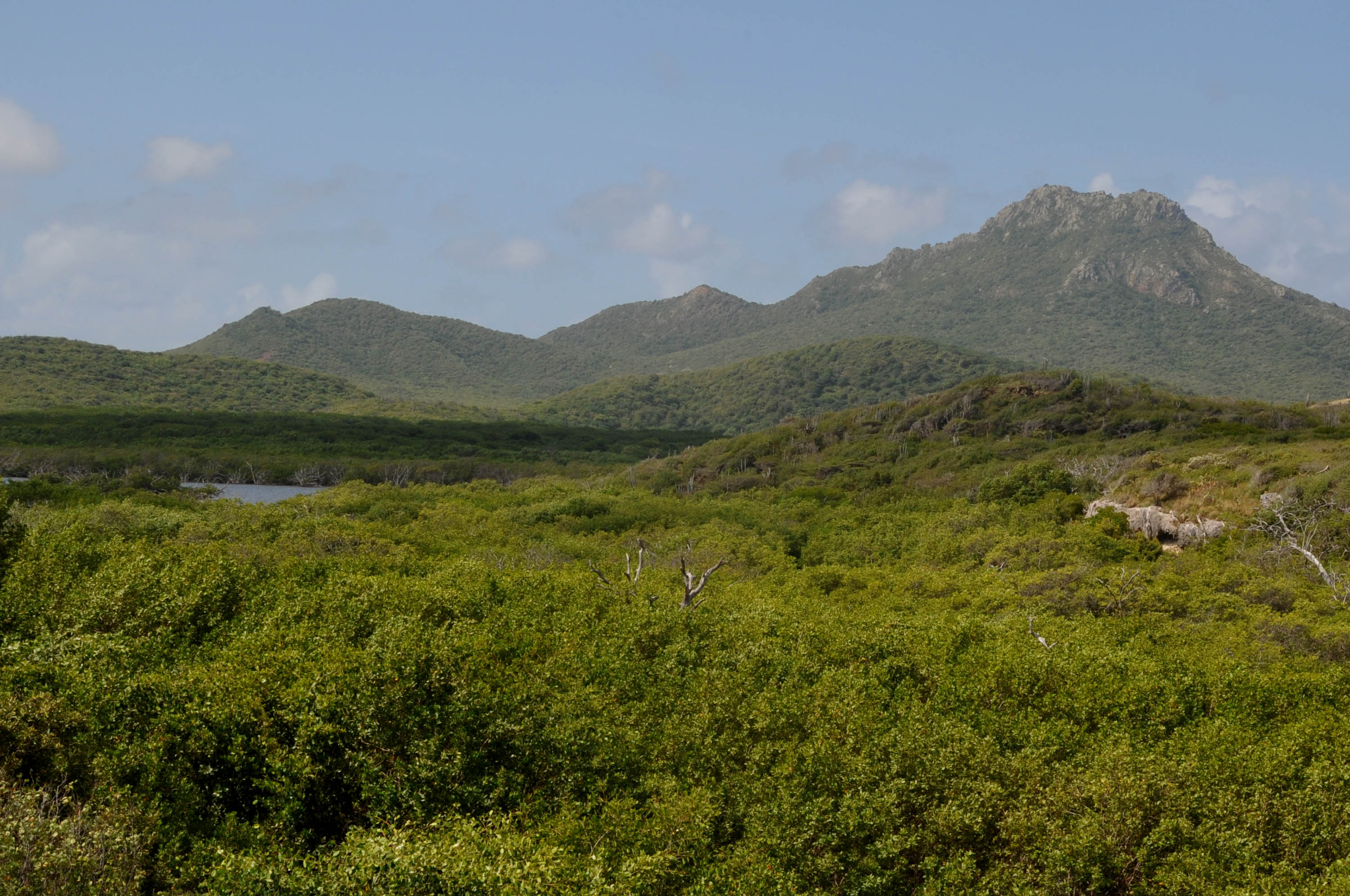

Highest point
- Elevation: 372 m (1,220 ft)
- Prominence: 372 m (1,220 ft)
- Listing: Country high point
- Coordinates: 12°20′13″N 69°7′23″W

Geography
- Location within Curaçao Location within ABC islands (Lesser Antilles)
- Location: Curaçao

The Christoffelberg, also known as Mt Christoffel or Mt St Christoffel, named after Saint Christopher, is the highest point on Curaçao. The Christoffelberg is 372 metres (1,220 ft) high and lies in the reserved wildlife park, Curaçao Christoffelpark, which can be explored by car, bike, horse, or on foot using several trails that have been laid out for this purpose.

== See also ==
- Tafelberg, in the south-east of Curaçao
