= Tafelberg (Curaçao) =

Large hill in Curaçao

- Table Mountain or Seru Mesa
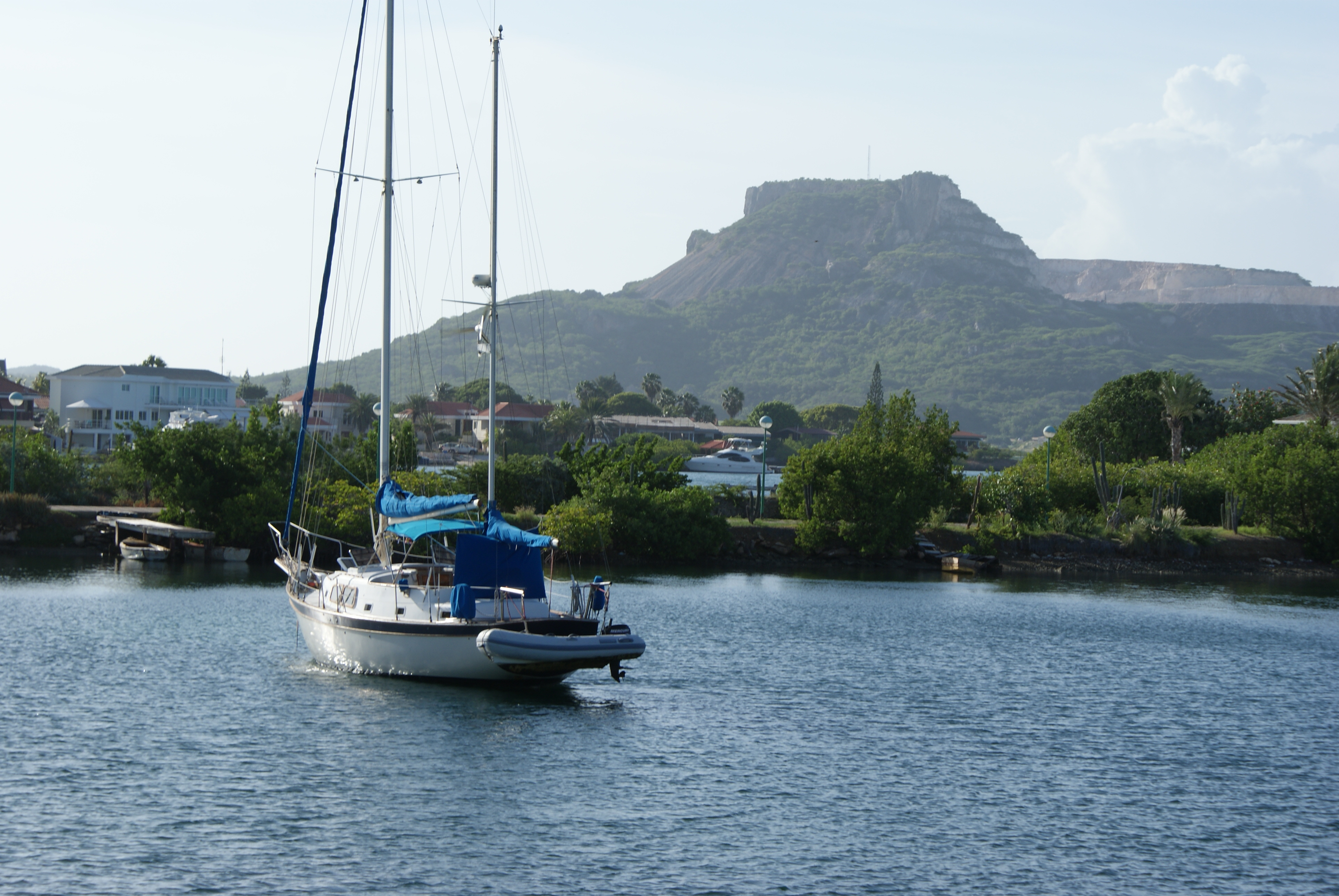
- In 2010, with much of the right-hand side already removed by mining

Highest point
- Elevation: 196.1 m (643 ft)
- Coordinates: 12°4′N 68°50′W

Geography
- Location within Curaçao Location within ABC islands (Lesser Antilles)
- Location: Curaçao

Tafelberg (Table Mountain) is a large flat-topped hill in Curaçao, an island state in the Dutch Caribbean.

The Tafelberg mesa is in southeastern Curaçao, near the Santa Barbara beach. It is 196.1 metres (643 ft) high, making it only the fourth-highest point on Curaçao behind the 372 metres (1,220 ft) Christoffelberg and two intermediate peaks, all in the volcanic northwest of the island. It is formed mostly of the Quaternary (Note: Up to 2.5 million years old – recent in geological terms) limestone that forms the south-east of Curaçao, although there are also commercially-significant phosphate and calcareous sand deposits.

Fossils of Pleistocene (Note: i.e. first epoch of the Quaternary) giant tortoises, Chelonoidis, of an estimated 80 centimetres (31 in) carapace length have been found in fill deposits. (Note: These were assigned to the genus Geochelone when first found, but the South American Geochelones have since been re-classified.)

The vegetation of the area is sparse, owing to the endemic lack of water on Curaçao. Comparisons of grazed and inaccessibly ungrazed areas show that the natural vegetation was predominantly of the bromeliad Tillandsia flexuosa, (Note: These Tillandsia species are so drought tolerant that they are sometimes sold as 'airplants', as they are able to survive in a domestic house without watering, merely on atmospheric humidity.) but that this could not tolerate grazing and since the introduction of livestock by humans, primarily goats, has largely been replaced by annual grasses, prickly pear and shrubby acacias.

== Mining ==
Phosphate mining began at Santa Barbara in the 1870s, although by 1900 it had been abandoned and the island was in an economically near-derelict state. Mining stopped in 1891, largely owing to a dispute between the landowner and John Godden, (Note: Godden was the mining engineer who had spurred 'guano mania' in the Dutch Antilles, with his discovery in 1871 of exploitable deposits on Klein Curaçao, San Nicolaas on Aruba and at Tafelberg.) the English operator of the mine, and the last exports were in 1895, after 175,000 tons had been exported. It re-opened though in 1913 and was still in operation at the time of Willem van de Poll's visit in 1947. From 1914, the entire economy of Curaçao was re-invigorated by the construction of the Isla oil refinery to refine Venezuelan crude oil. The first railway on the island was built for phosphate traffic, a gravity-worked cable funicular from the mountain to the harbour on Fuikbaai near Nieuwpoort.

Limestone is also mined in the area and with the great expansion and prosperity post-WWII, this was in demand for the production of cement and, with local sand, concrete for local construction, aided by cheap fuel as distillation waste from the refinery. By the 1960s, this had led to a perceptible change in the shape of the mountain when viewed from a distance. To preserve its appearance, mining since has adopted a 'hollow-tooth' strategy, where mining proceeds and has hollowed out much of the volume of the mountain, whilst preserving its outer periphery, at least for the remaining Northern face.

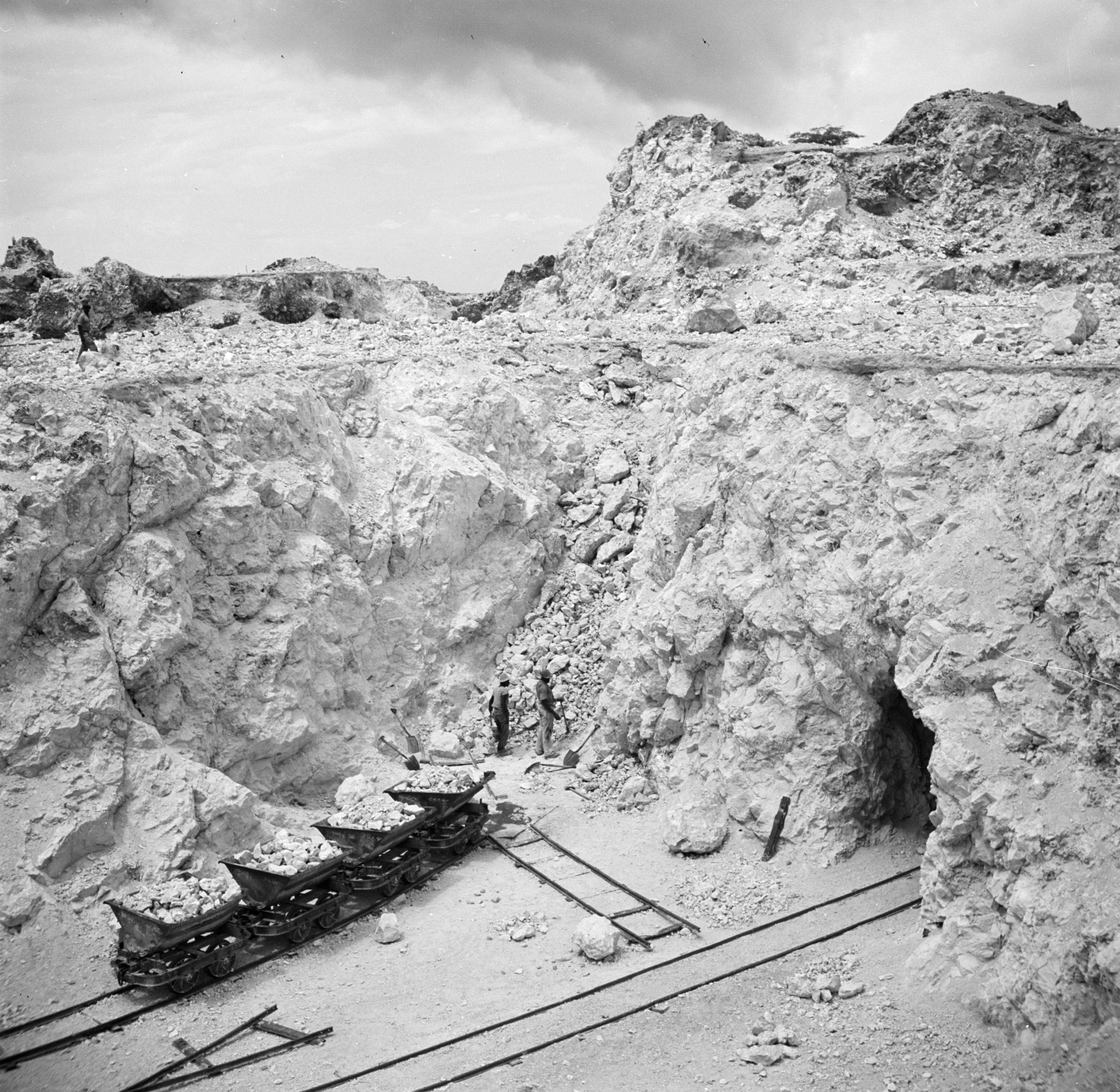
Phosphate mining in 1947

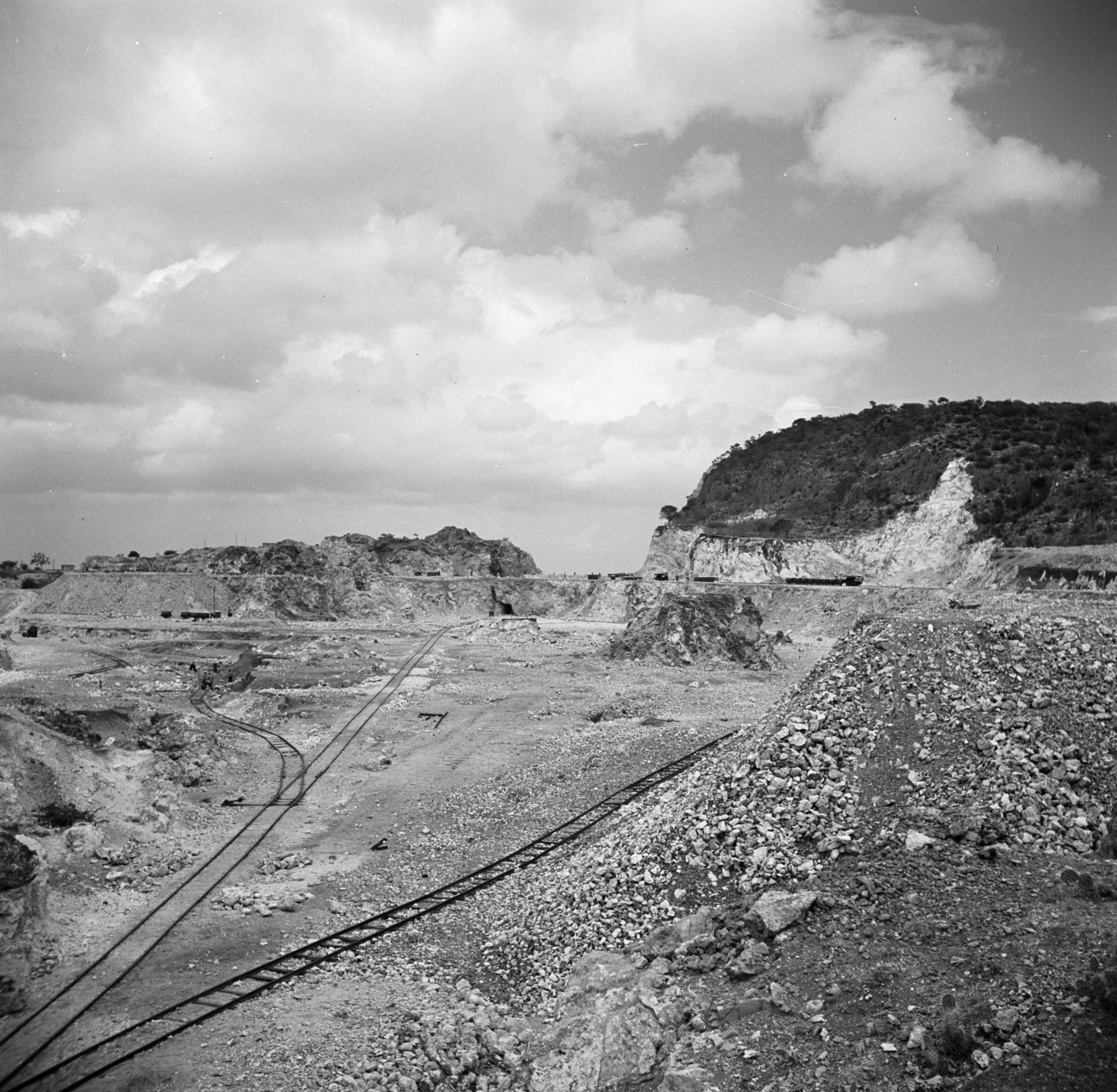
Phosphate mine in 1947

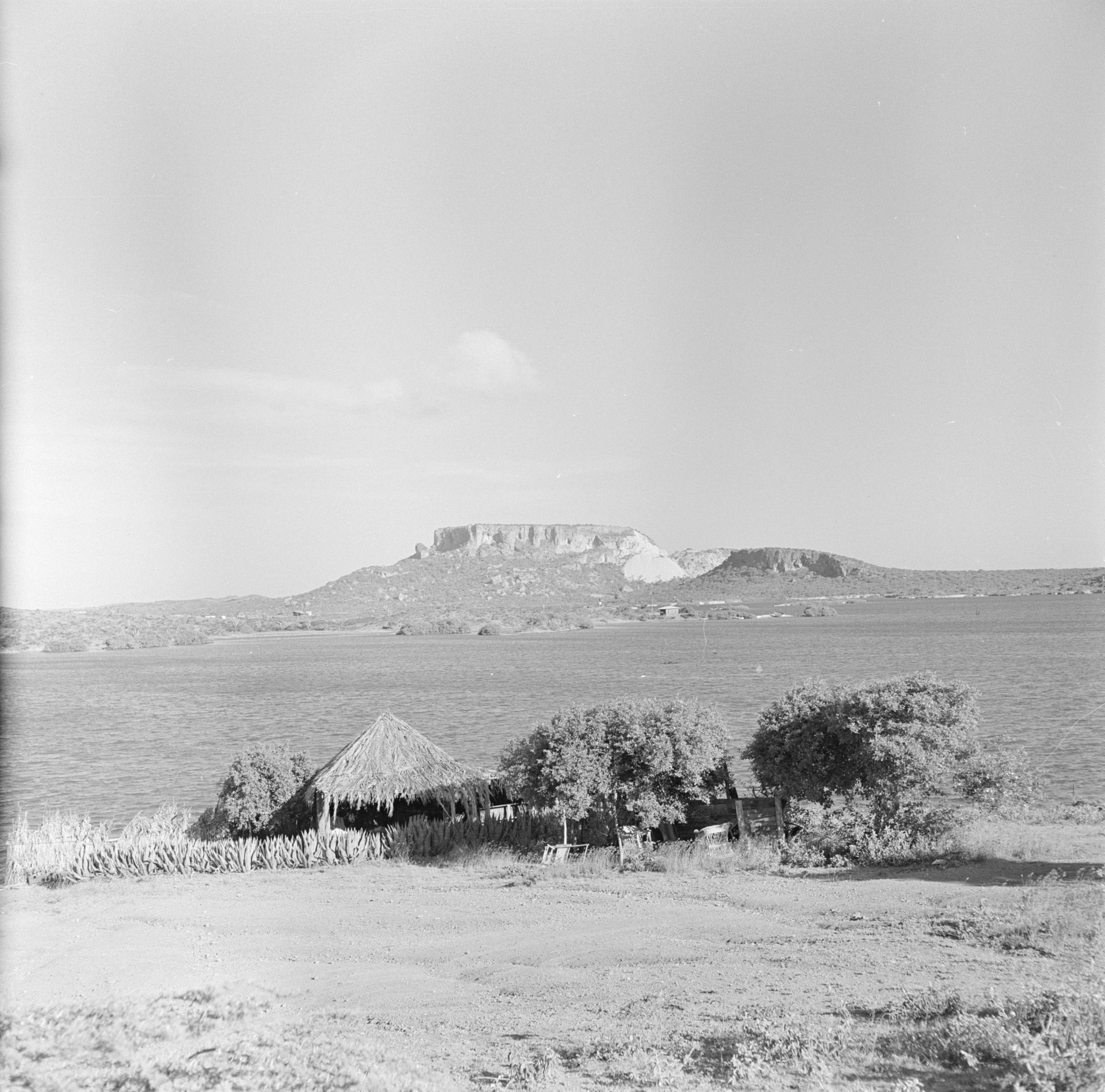
In 1955, before mining changed the shape of the hill
