= Jimmy Høyer =

Danish footballer (born 1978)

Personal information
- Date of birth: 8 January 1978 (age 48)
- Place of birth: Denmark
- Height: 1.74 m (5 ft 8 1/2 in)
- Positions: Fullback; midfielder

Team information
- Current team: Víkingur

Senior career*
Years	Team	Apps	(Gls)
–1999	Farsø/Ullits IK		
1999–2000	AaB		
2000–2005	Aarhus Fremad		
2005–2008	AGF	9	(0)
2008–2010	Víkingur	21	(3)
- Aarhus Fremad

Managerial career
- 2009–2010: Aarhus Fremad (player assistant)
- * Club domestic league appearances and goals

Jimmy Høyer (born 8 January 1978) is a Danish professional football midfielder who currently plays for Icelandic team Knattspyrnufélagið Víkingur.
