= Johann Adam Hoyer =

Austrian clockmaker

Johann Adam Hoyer was a clockmaker and master craftsman in Josefstadt (now the 8th district of Vienna) who died in 1838. There are a few known examples of his work still extant, including a flute clock and a miniature wall clock from the Biedermeier era. He is credited with developing a clock that was wound by the creation of hydrogen.

Hoyer was one of a few clockmakers in the early 19th century who experimented with hydrogen-powered winding mechanisms. Pasquale Andervalt in Italy c. 1835 was another, and his clock is in the Clockmakers' Company in London.

A hydrogen-wound clock is described in the Country Life International Dictionary of Clocks: "It consists of an open-centred dial exposing the mechanism, with a pin-pallet escapement and ornate gilt pendulum bob, the clock movement being mounted on supports fixed to a large red glass cylinder. Above the movement is a coiled spiral brass tube holding balls of zinc which, as the driving weight nears its lower position, are released one by one to fall into a solution of dilute sulphuric acid in the red glass jar. Hydrogen gas is generated and the resulting pressure lifts the entire mechanism behind the dial, winding the going weight, the larger of the two visible. The smaller weight is used to maintain the clock in motion whilst the larger is wound, the winding process being quite slow. On completion of the winding the hydrogen gas is released in preparation for the next cycle. These clocks are rare; hydrogen is a most inflammable gas and perhaps the majority have exploded in use."
