= Luidjino Hoyer =

Curaçaoan footballer

Personal information
- Full name: Luidjino Martir Hojer
- Date of birth: 5 February 1988 (age 38)
- Place of birth: Santa Rosa, Netherlands Antilles
- Height: 1.78 m (5 ft 10 in)
- Position: Midfielder

Team information
- Current team: Magreb '90
- Number: 14

Senior career*
Years	Team	Apps	(Gls)
2009–2014	Victory Boys	?	(?)
2015	Centro Dominguito	?	(?)
2015–	Magreb '90	9	(0)

International career^{‡}
- Curaçao U17
2011–	Curaçao	16	(0)
- * Club domestic league appearances and goals as of 11 October 2015 ‡ National team caps and goals as of 23 May 2017

Luidjino Martir Hojer (born 5 February 1988) known as Luidjino Hoyer, is a Curaçaoan footballer who plays as a midfielder for Magreb '90 in the Dutch Topklasse and for the Curaçao national team.

== Club career ==
Born in Santa Rosa, Curaçao, Netherlands Antilles, Hoyer began his career with S.V. Victory Boys in the Sekshon Pagá, the highest level of football in Curaçao. He parted with the club after six seasons, playing for RKSV Centro Dominguito, whom he helped to their fourth national championship in 2015 winning the FKK Player of the Year award in the process. He then relocated to the Netherlands, signing with V.V. Magreb '90, competing in the Topklasse, the third tier of professional football in the Netherlands. He made his debut on 23 August 2015 in a 2–0 away win against FC Lienden.

== International career ==
Hoyer plays for the national team of Curaçao, on 19 August 2011, Hoyer made his first appearance for Curaçao in the countries first official match after the dissolution of the Netherlands Antilles, a friendly encounter against the Dominican Republic ending in a 1–0 loss. He also played in the ABCS Tournament, the 2014 Caribbean Cup and the 2018 FIFA World Cup qualification.

== Career statistics ==
=== International performance ===
Statistics accurate as of matches played on 8 September 2015,

Curaçao national team
Year	Apps	Goals
2011	2	0
2012	0	0
2013	0	0
2014	9	0
2015	4	0
Total	15	0

== Honors ==
=== Club ===
RKSV Centro Dominguito

- Sekshon Pagá (1): 2015

=== Individual ===
- FFK Player of the Year: 2015
