= Johann Georg Hoyer =

German physician (1663–1738)

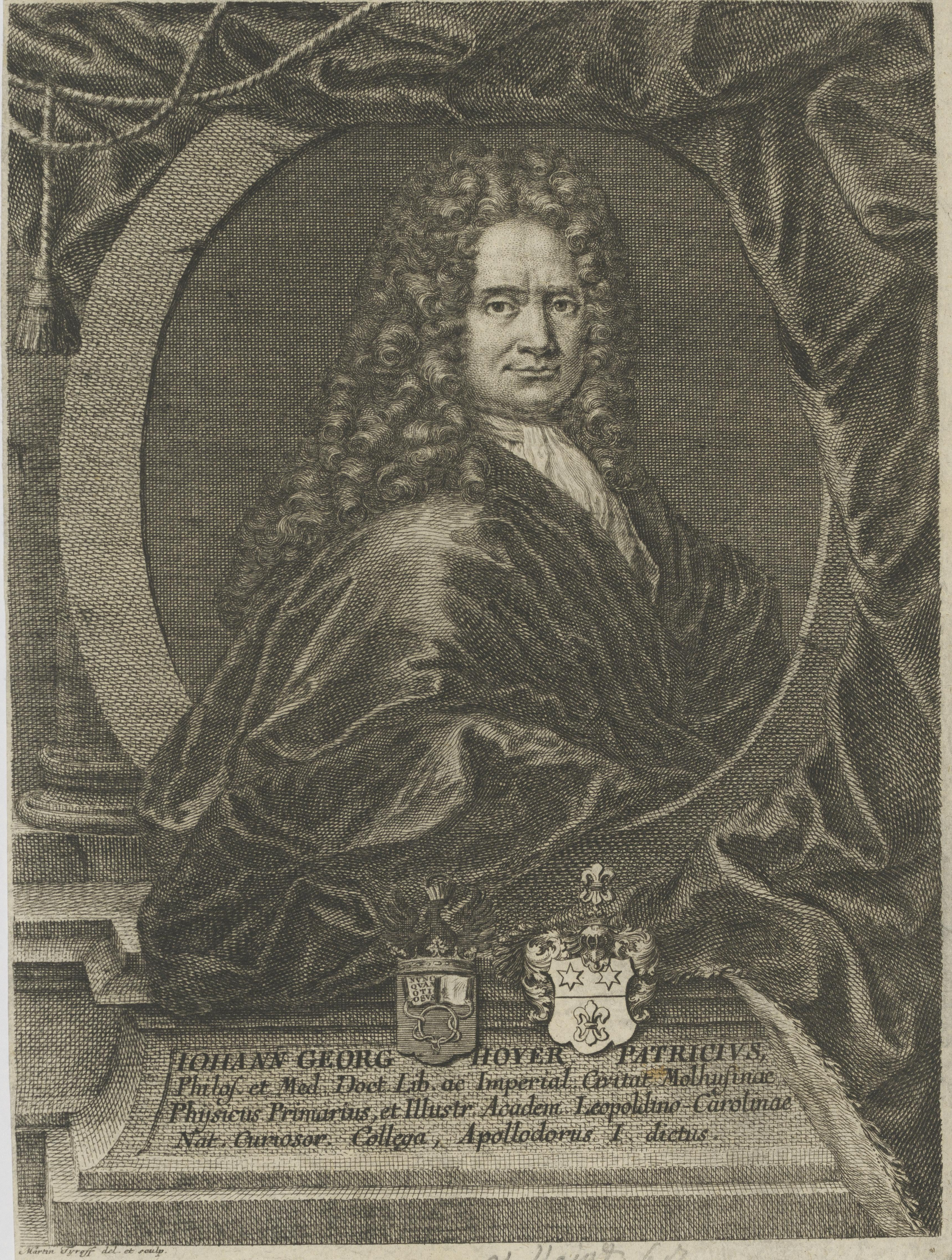
Engraving by Martin Tyroff

Johann Georg Hoyer (23/26 August 1663, Mühlhausen – 1 April 1738) was a city physician in the town of Mühlhausen and natural philosopher. He was a member of the Leopoldina Academy of Scholars.

== Life and work ==
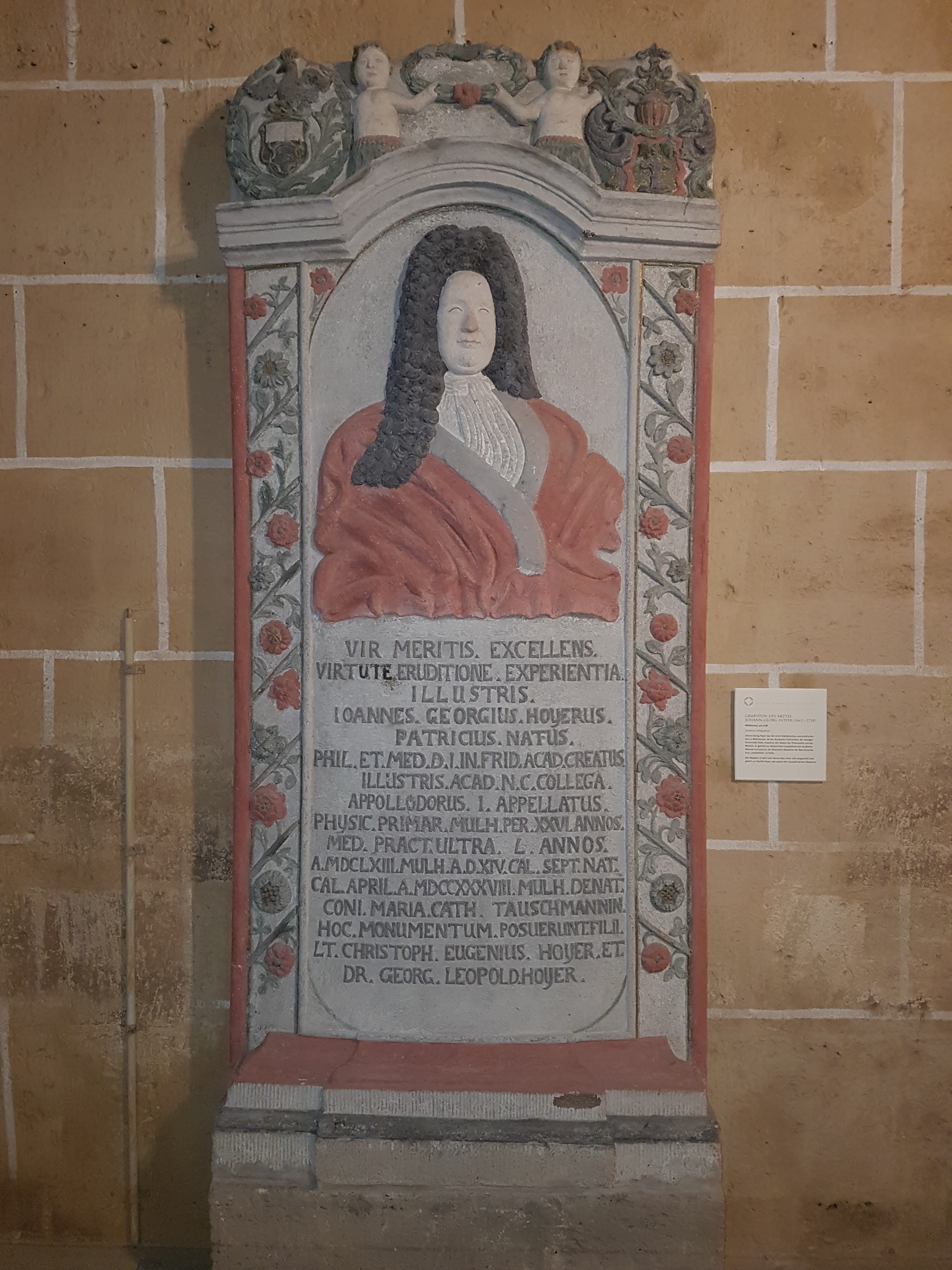
Memorial at St. Mary's Church Mühlhausen

Hoyer was born in a well-known Mühlhausen family and went to grammar school in Weissenfels. From 1684 he studied medicine at the University of Jena and then became a general practitioner in Mühlhausen. He visited England, Holland and Denmark in 1689 and spent four years in Copenhagen. He returned in 1693 in which time his parents' home had been destroyed in a fire. He received a doctorate from the University of Halle with a thesis that supported and translated the ideas of Friedrich Hoffmann (1660–1742) who refuted the ideas of Cornelis Bontekoe (1647–1685) and Steven Blankaart (1650–1702) that diseases arose from interactions between acid and mucus. He was made city physician by the council of Mühlhausen. In 1695 he was admitted as a member (registration number 216) of the German Academy of Natural Scientists Leopoldina under the pseudonym Apollodorus I. His most famous work was a medical guide published in 1716 which was a revised edition of Pharmacopoea domestica er postalis (1668) by Laurentius Blumentrost (1619–1705) which went by the title of Hauß- und Reiß-Apotheck - a manual of home and travel remedies for various diseases. This included various doubtful ideas including the recipe for a curative rosemary water that was supposedly written by the Queen Elizabeth of Hungary. In the preface Hoyer wrote that Blumentrost was driven not by honor and money to serve in Russia but was answering a divine call to duty.

Hoyer had two sons, physician Christoph Eugen Hoyer and lawyer Georg Leopold Hoyer. A memorial is in the Marienkirche in Mühlhausen.
