= Henryk Ferdynand Hoyer =

Polish zoologist (1864–1947)

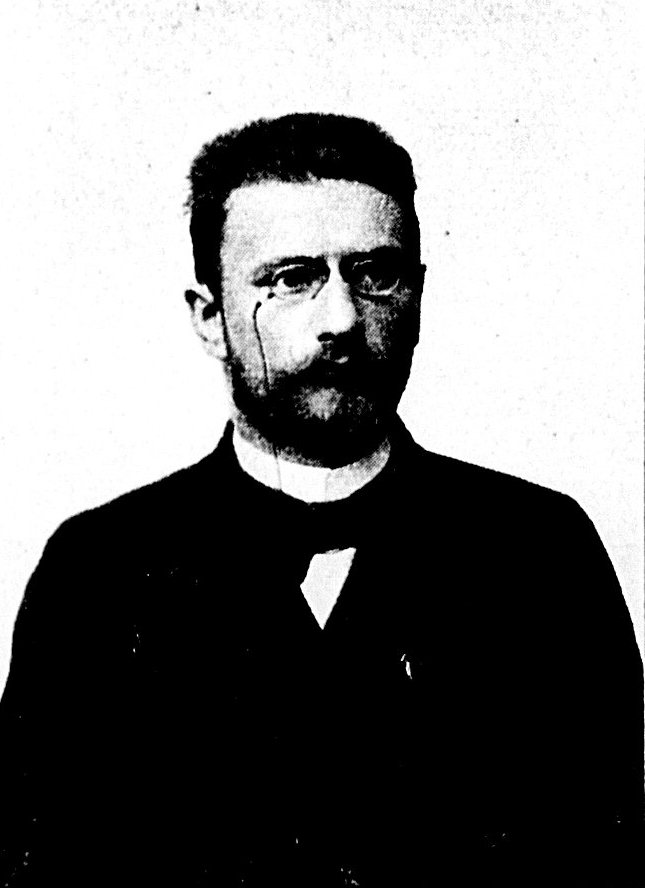

Henryk Ferdynand Hoyer (13 July 1864 – 17 October 1947) was a Polish zoologist and professor of comparative anatomy at the Jagiellonian University from 1894 to 1934 serving also as its rector. He is sometimes referred to as Henryk Hoyer junior to differentiate him from his father, Henryk Frederyk Hoyer (1834-1907), who is considered the founder of histology in Poland.

== Biography ==
Hoyer was born in Warsaw to Ludwika née Werner and Henryk Frederyk, histologist and professor at the University of Warsaw. Educated at the Gymnasium in Bydgoszcz, he then studied at the University of Breslau and at Strasbourg, receiving a doctorate from the Friedrich Wilhelm University in Berlin in 1892. He worked as an assistant to Albert Kölliker at Würzburg and Gustav Schwalbe in Strasbourg before moving to the Jagiellonian University, Kraków in 1894. He became a full professor in 1904. He became a dean in 1909 and rector in 1929. In 1939 he was arrested during Sonderaktion Krakau and sent to Sachsenhausen. He was in charge of a pharmacy for prisoners of war in Krakow from 1941 to 1944.

Hoyer's students included Edward Niezabitowski, Eugeniusz Kiernik, Władysław Poliński, Jan Prüffer, Władysław Mierzejewski, Paweł Łoziński, Jan Marchlewski, Zygmunt Grodziński, Józef Fudakowski, Stanisław Michał Sumiński, Zygmunt Fedorowicz, Stanisław Skowron, Jan Stach, and Szymon Tenenbaum.
