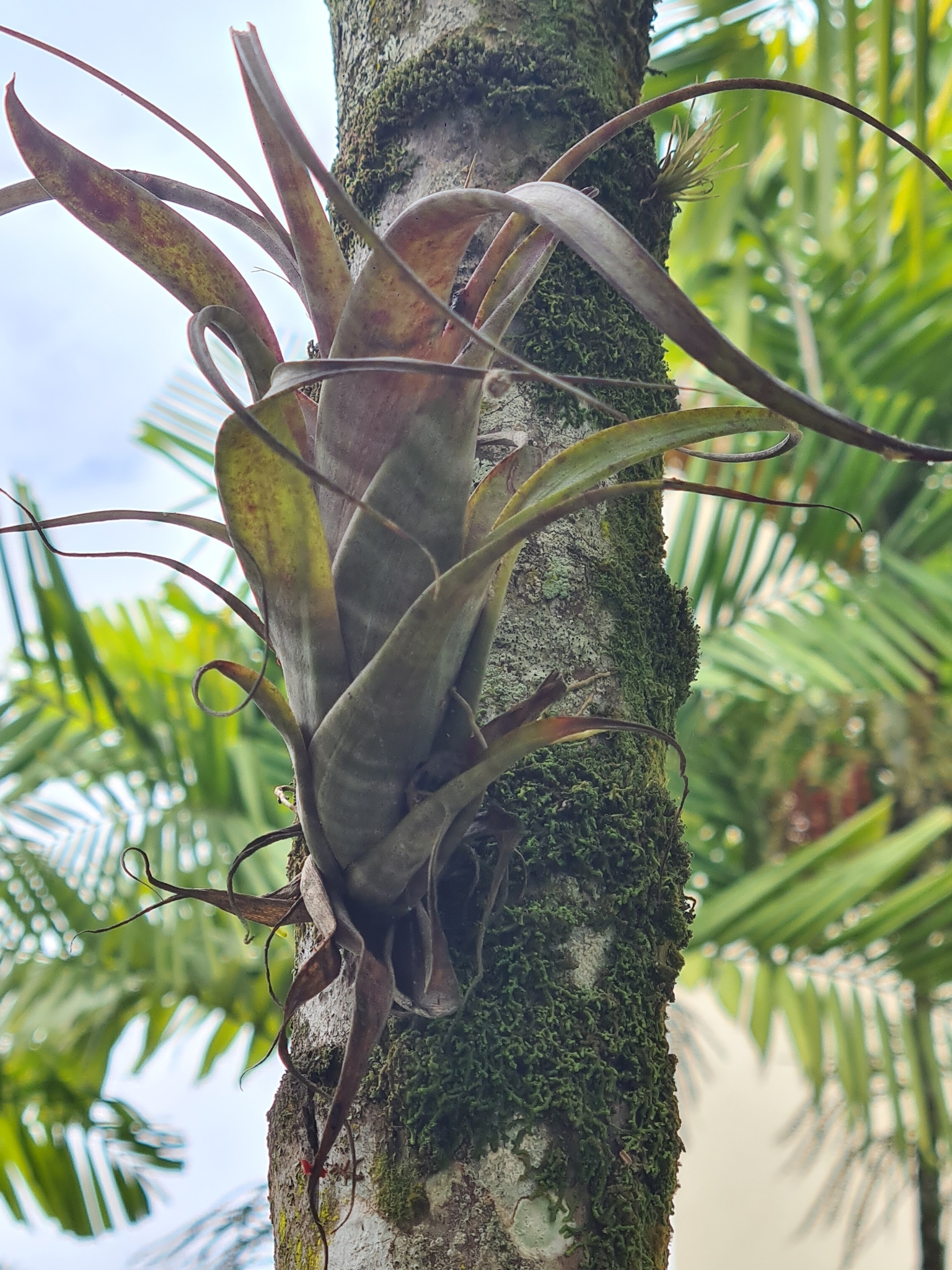

Scientific classification
- Kingdom: Plantae
- Clade: Tracheophytes
- Clade: Angiosperms
- Clade: Monocots
- Clade: Commelinids
- Order: Poales
- Family: Bromeliaceae
- Genus: Tillandsia
- Subgenus: Tillandsia subg. Tillandsia
- Species: T. flexuosa

Binomial name
- Tillandsia flexuosa Swartz

Synonyms
- Anoplophytum flexuosum (Sw.) Beer; Tillandsia aloifolia Hook.; Tillandsia patens Willd. ex Schult. & Schult.f.; Vriesea aloifolia (Hook.) Beer; Vriesea tenuifolia Beer; Platystachys patens (Willd. ex Schult. & Schult.f.) K.Koch

= Tillandsia flexuosa =

Species of plant

Tillandsia flexuosa, the twisted airplant, is a species of bromeliad in the genus Tillandsia. This species is native to Central America, southeastern Mexico (Veracruz, Yucatán Peninsula), northern South America (Colombia, Venezuela, Guianas) and the United States (Florida).
