= Koraal Partir =

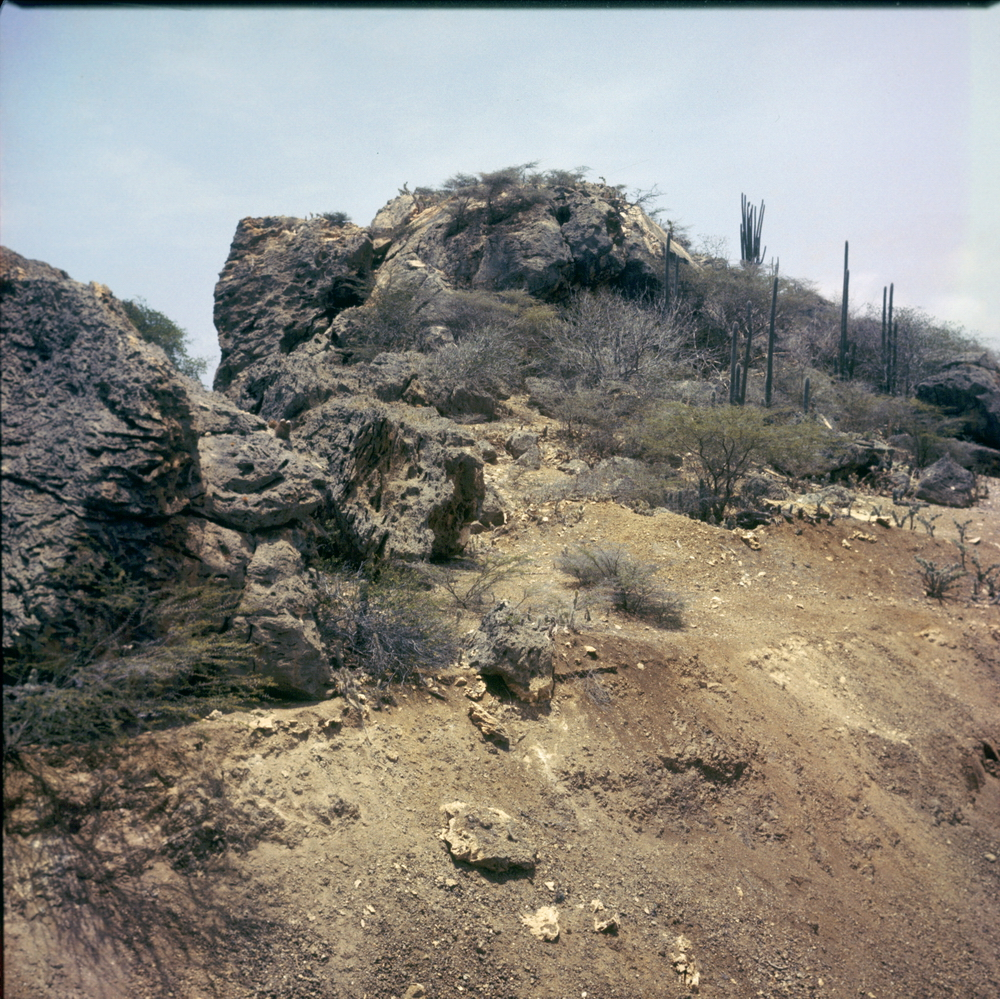
- Landscape near Koraal Tabak

- Location in Curaçao
- Coordinates: 12.1298°N 68.8538°W
- State: Kingdom of the Netherlands
- Country: Curaçao
- City: Willemstad

Population (2011)
  - Total: 3,958

Koraal Partir (also Koraal Partier) is a town in located at the northeast of Curaçao. It is situated close to the north coast of the island, and northeast of the capital Willemstad. The village of Brievengat lies to the west, and Sint Jorisbaai lies to the east. Koraal Partir was a former plantation which was abandoned around 1800. The town started to develop in the 19th century when former slaves settled in the area between the plantations of Santa Catharina, Koraal Tabak, Choloma and Sint Joris.

== Bibliography ==
- Buurtprofiel Kooral Partir (2011). "Buurtprofiel Kooral Partir" (PDF). Government of Curaçao (in Dutch).
