= Henryk Fryderyk Hoyer =

Polish physician (1834–1907)

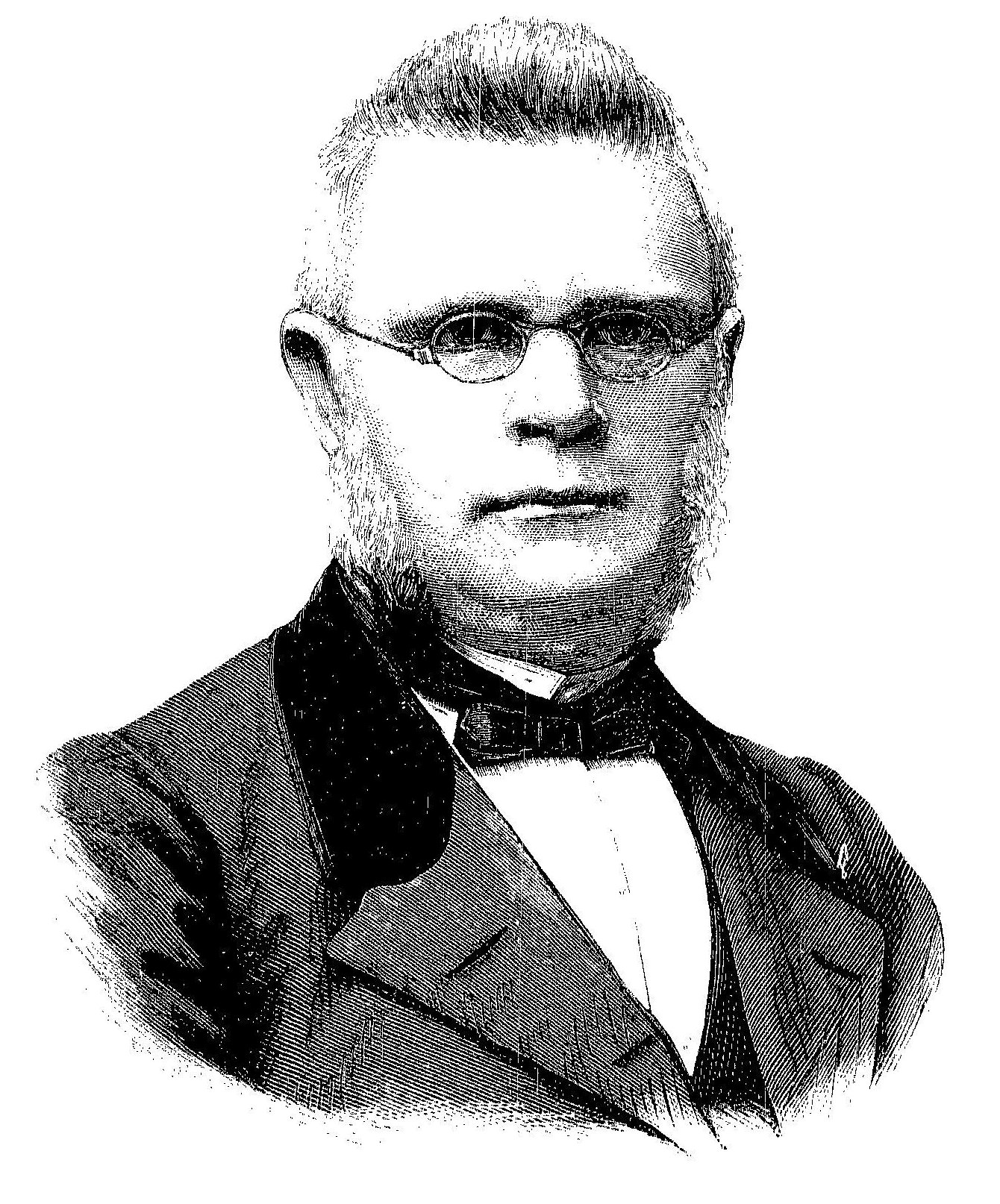

Henryk Fryderyk Hoyer (26 April 1834 – 3 July 1907) was a Polish physician and professor at the University of Warsaw who is considered the founder of histology in Poland. He wrote the first textbook on histology in Polish in 1862. He is sometimes referred to as Henryk Hoyer (senior) to differentiate him from his son, the anatomist Henryk Ferdynand Hoyer. Hoyer's medium and Hoyer's solution are named after him.

== Life and work ==
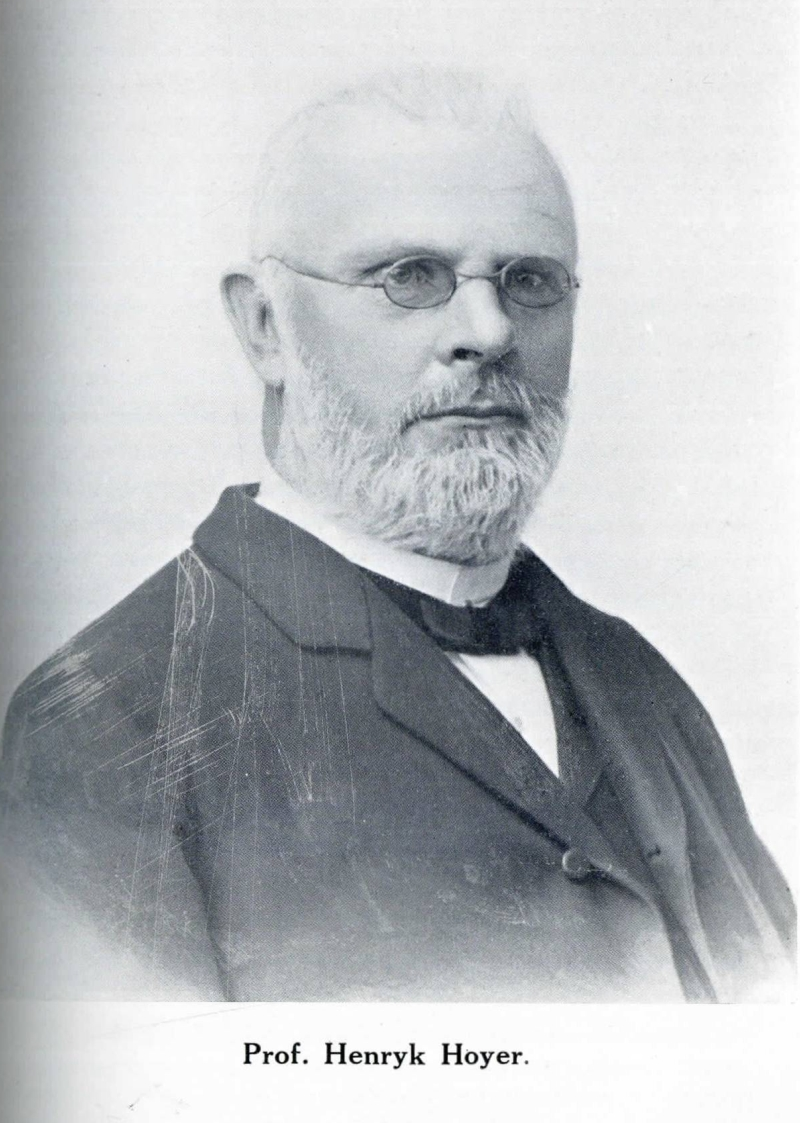
Hoyer in later life

Hoyer was born in Inowrocław to pharmacist Ferdynand Hoyer and Helena née Trzcińska who died shortly after his birth. He went to school in Inowrocław and Bydgoszcz before studying medicine at Wrocław and Berlin. He was influenced by the teachings of Rudolf Virchow, Johannes Müller, and Ernst Haeckel. After receiving his medical degree in 1857 he became an assistant to Karl Reichert at the University of Wrocław. He then became an assistant professor at Warsaw in 1859 and a full professor of embryology in 1862. He began to lose his eyesight from 1894.

Hoyer translated several textbooks, wrote a textbook on human histology in 1862. He was an evolutionist and a promoter of evolutionary thinking in human biology. In 1876 he described arteriovenous anastomoses (known as Hoyer bodies) and in 1882 he described a medium for mounting stained material on microscope slides using gum arabica and chloral hydrate. This was later refined but the name Hoyer's solution is widely used in biology. He is also remembered in a medium for growing Acetobacter that is called Hoyer's medium. His students included Józef Nusbaum-Hilarowicz, Edward Strasburger, Zygmunt Laskowski, Wacław Mayzel, Kazimierz Kostanecki, Teodor Dunin, Zygmunt Kramsztyk, Władysław Matlakowski and Józef Peszke.

Hoyer married Ludwika, daughter of pharmacy professor Emil Werner, in 1863. Their son Henryk Ferdynand Hoyer (1864–1947) became an anatomist of repute. Hoyer (senior) died of bone tuberculosis and is buried in the Evangelical-Augsburg Cemetery.

== Sources ==
- "Гойер, Генрих Фердинандович" . Brockhaus and Efron Encyclopedic Dictionary (in Russian). 1906.
