= Spaanse Water =

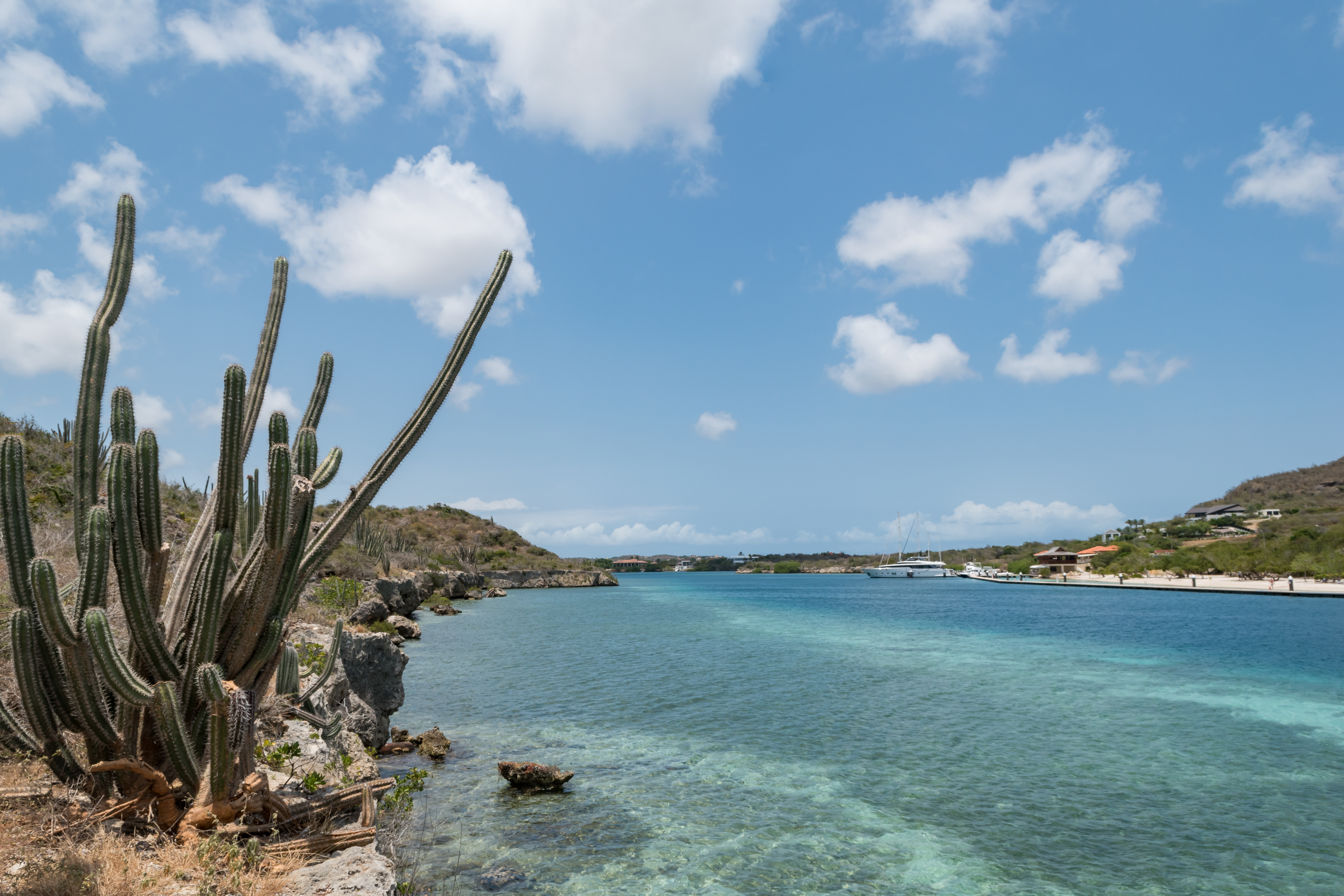
- Spaanse Water

- Location in Curaçao
- Coordinates: 12.0673°N 68.8501°W
- State: Kingdom of the Netherlands
- Country: Curaçao
- District: Bandariba

Area
  - Total: 20.98 km^{2} (8.10 sq mi)

Population (2011)
  - Total: 3,119
  - Density: 148.7/km^{2} (385.0/sq mi)

Spaanse Water is a town on the island of Curaçao. It contains the tourist resort Nieuwpoort, the village of Santa Barbara, and the Tafelberg. Spaanse Water is a natural harbour and lagoon located to the east of Willemstad. The lagoon contains several bays and little islands.

== History ==
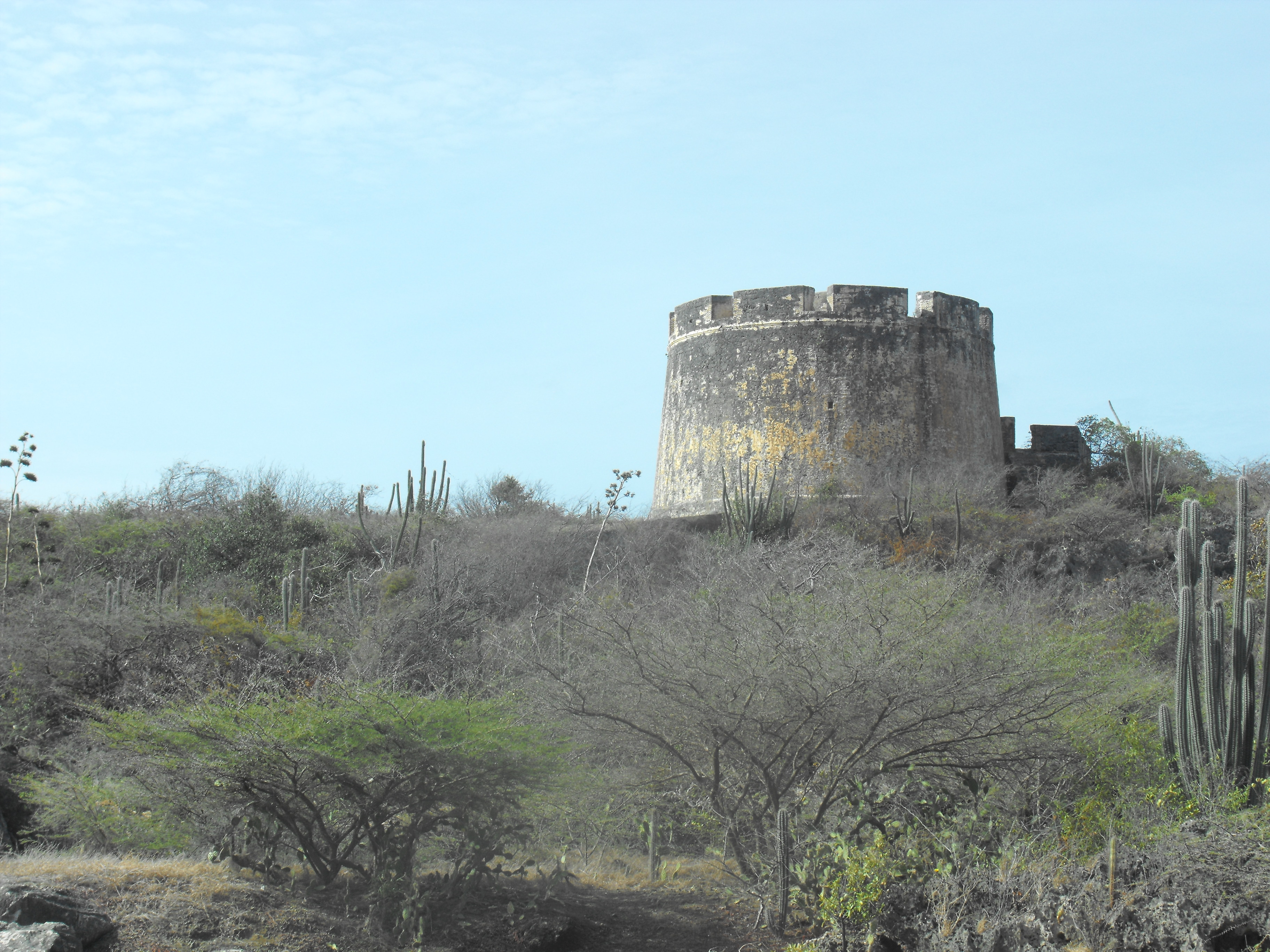
Fort Beekenburg (2010)

Spaanse Water was a strategically important location. In 1703, Fort Beekenburg was constructed on the Caracas Bay to protect the natural harbour and the back route to Willemstad. The fort was built by Nicolaas van Beek who at the time served as Director of Curaçao. It has been attacked several times by the French, English, and pirates, but has never been conquered. The fort used to be owned by Royal Dutch Shell, but since 2005, it is publicly accessible.

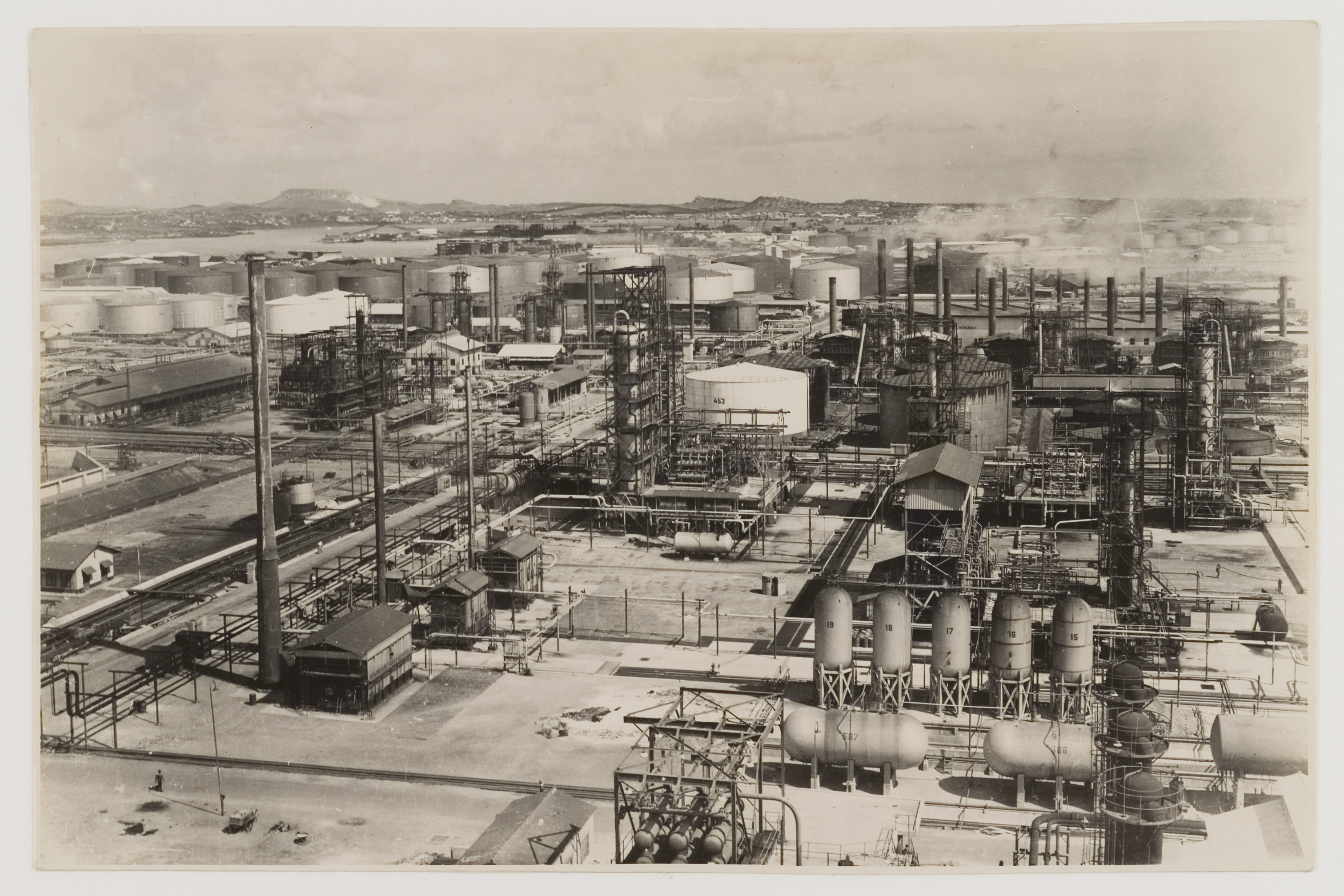
Oil terminal in Spaanse Water with Tafelberg in the background

Santa Barbara is a plantation founded in 1662, and was one of the oldest and largest plantations on the island. It was not very profitable, and sold in January 1875. The plantation was subsequently resold to John Godden in May 1875 who started a large scale phosphate mine on the terrain. In 1915, a calcium mine was added to the site. The mines are still active, and the mining company has estimated that the reserves will last until 2045. In 1927, Royal Dutch Shell built an oil terminal in Spaanse Water. The oil terminal closed in 2005.

In the late 20th century, Spaanse Water developed into a tourist location. The resorts Nieuwpoort, Jan Thiel, and Santa Barbara Beach & Golf were established for the tourists.

== Bibliography ==
- Buurtprofiel Spaanse Water (2011). "Buurtprofiel Spaanse Water" (PDF). Government of Curaçao (in Dutch).
