= Oostpunt =

Region of Curaçao

Oostpunt Land van Maal
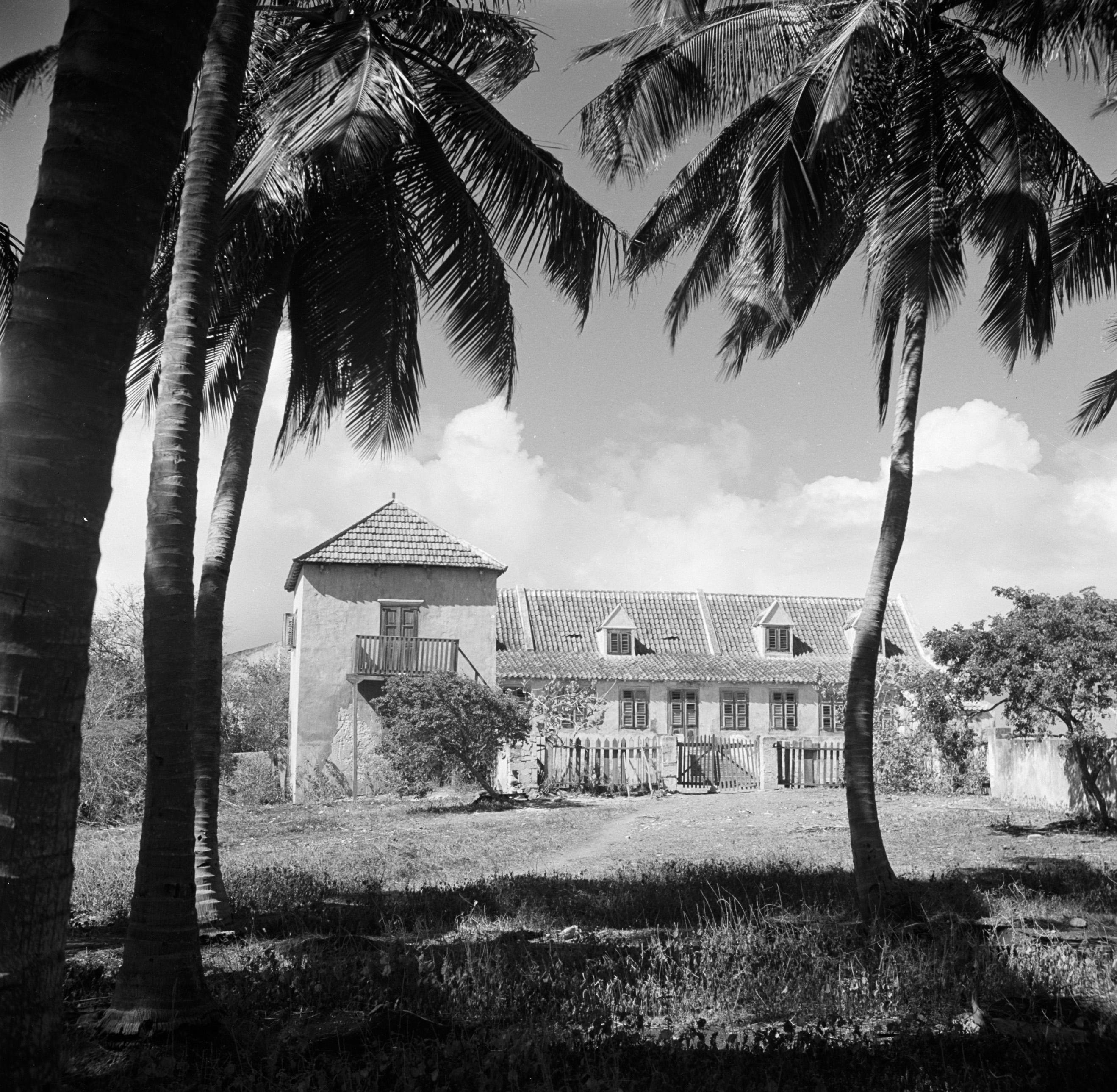
- Landhuis Klein Sint Joris

- Location in Curaçao
- Coordinates: 12.0587°N 68.7807°W
- State: Kingdom of the Netherlands
- Country: Curaçao
- District: Bandariba

Area
  - Total: 54.24 km^{2} (20.94 sq mi)

Population (2011)
  - Total: 555
  - Density: 10.2/km^{2} (26.5/sq mi)

Oostpunt (also Land van Maal) is a geozone (region) on the island of Curaçao. It is located on the easternmost point of the island. Since the 1870s, the area has been privately owned by the Maal family, and most of the area is off-limits, with the exception of the villages of Oostpunt, Sint Joris, and Santa Catharina. The geozone of Oostpunt covers about 10% of the island.

== History ==
Plantation Klein Sint Joris (also San Juan) was founded in 1662 by Matthias Beck and is one of the oldest plantations on Curaçao. Around 1840, Oostpunt was inhabited by 150 to 200 people, most of whom were slaves. The Maal family, army officers from the Netherlands, arrived in Curaçao in the late 18th century and had acquired five plantations by the 1870s. The plantations were used for agriculture, livestock, and mining, however, the vast majority of land is pristine wilderness. The coral reefs in Oostpunt are considered one of the best preserved reefs of the Caribbean.

== Settlements ==
The village of Oostpunt is only inhabited by Willy Maal and his mother. Sint Joris consists of a collection of houses across Landhuis Klein Sint Joris, and is mainly inhabited by locals who have been born there. Santa Catharina is a recent addition which started to develop in the 1960s, and has attracted many Dutch citizens. There are paved roads to Sint Joris and Santa Catharina. As of 2011, the remainder of Oostpunt can only be accessed via unpaved paths with large holes.

== National Park and Curaçao Marine Park ==
In 1987, the Government of Curaçao approached the Maal family to develop a conservation plan, and discuss the proposed development of a tourist resort in Oostpunt. In 1993, an area of 4,400 hectares (11,000 acres) was unilaterally declared a national park in which no development was possible. Along the coast, the Curaçao Marine Park was announced to protect the coral reef. The Maal family responded by suing the government for ƒ100 million (~US$56 million) for breach of contract. A long legal battle followed, and the resort was built in the Bahamas instead. On 7 June 1999, the Government of Curaçao was ordered to allow development in 50 percent of the area, and pay the Maal family ƒ20 million plus interest in damages.

In 2010, the development plans of the Maal family were approved by the States of Curaçao. The battle is not over, because CARMABI, the national institute for protected areas, wants to prevent any development, and is backed by the International Coral Reef Society, National Geographic, NOAA, and others. In April 2016, an attempt was made to stop the development plans using an outdated map which resulted in a threat from the Maal family to resume litigation. In December 2016, the development plans were once again approved by the States.

== Bibliography ==
- "Buurtprofiel Oostpunt" (PDF). Government of Curaçao (in Dutch). 2011.
