= Geography of Curaçao =

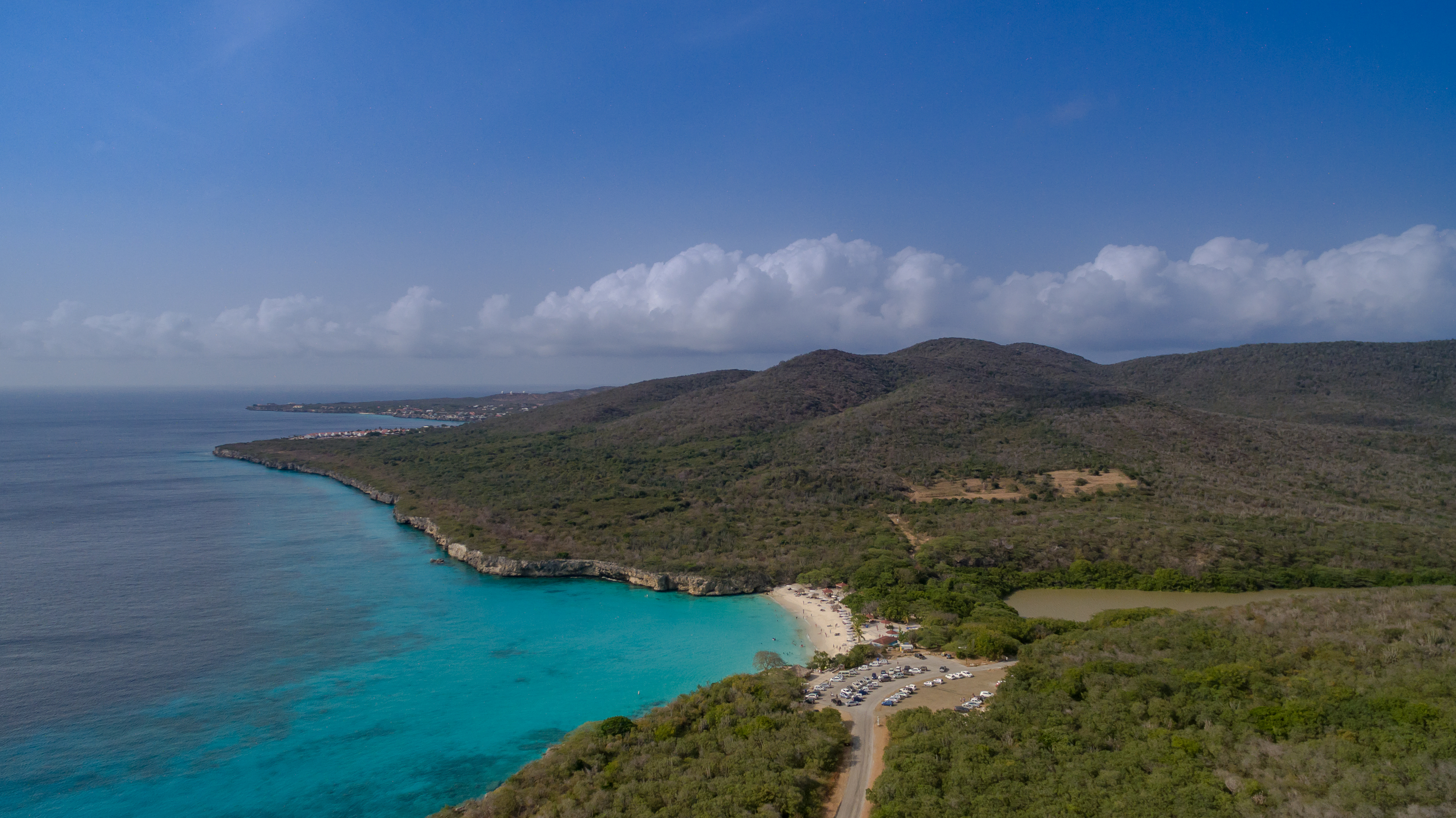
Aerial view of the coast of Curaçao

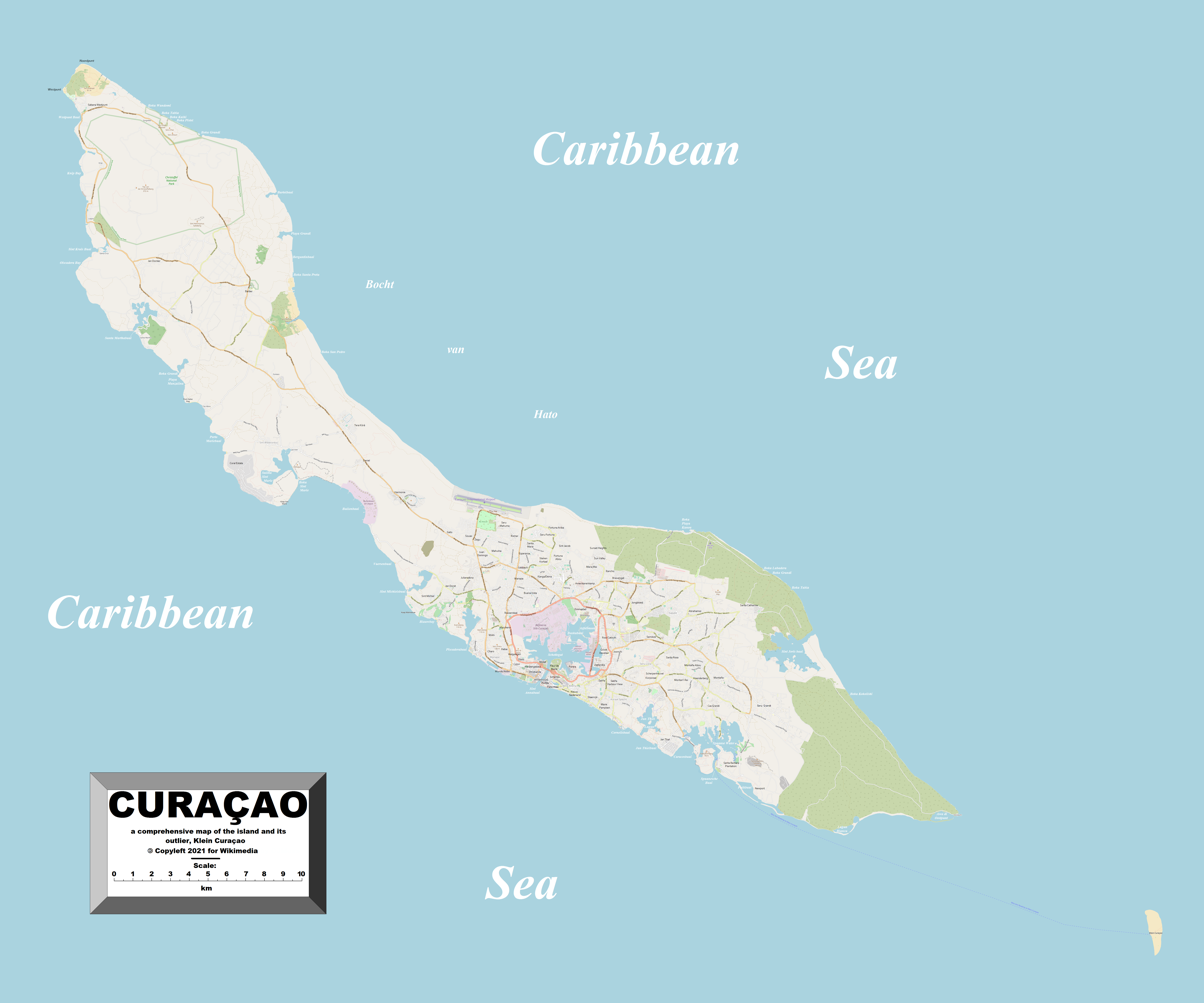
Enlargeable, detailed map of Curaçao

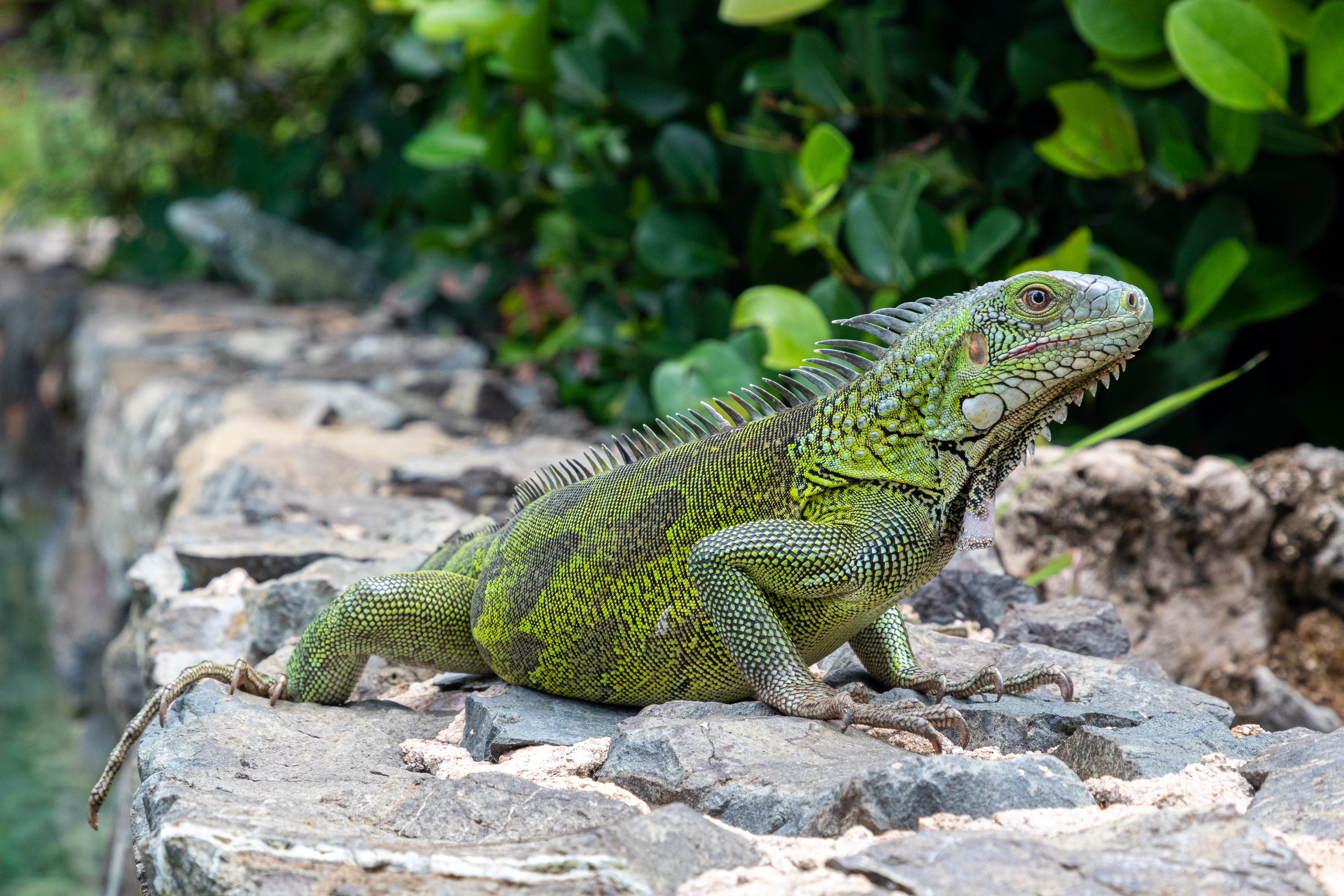
Green Iguana from Curaçao

Curaçao, as well as the rest of the ABC islands and Trinidad and Tobago, lies on the continental shelf of South America. It is a thin island with a generally hilly topography; the highest point is Christoffelberg 372 m (1,220 ft) in the northwest. Off the southeast coast lies the small, flat island of Klein Curaçao.

== Flora ==
Curaçao's flora differ from typical tropical island vegetation. Guajira-Barranquilla xeric scrub is the most notable, with various forms of cacti, thorny shrubs, evergreen, and watapana trees (Libidibia coriaria; called divi-divi on Aruba), which are characteristic of the ABC islands and the national symbol of Aruba. Brassavola nodosa is a drought-tolerant species of Brassavola, one of the few orchids present in the ABC islands. Cacti include Melocactus and Opuntia species such as Opuntia stricta.

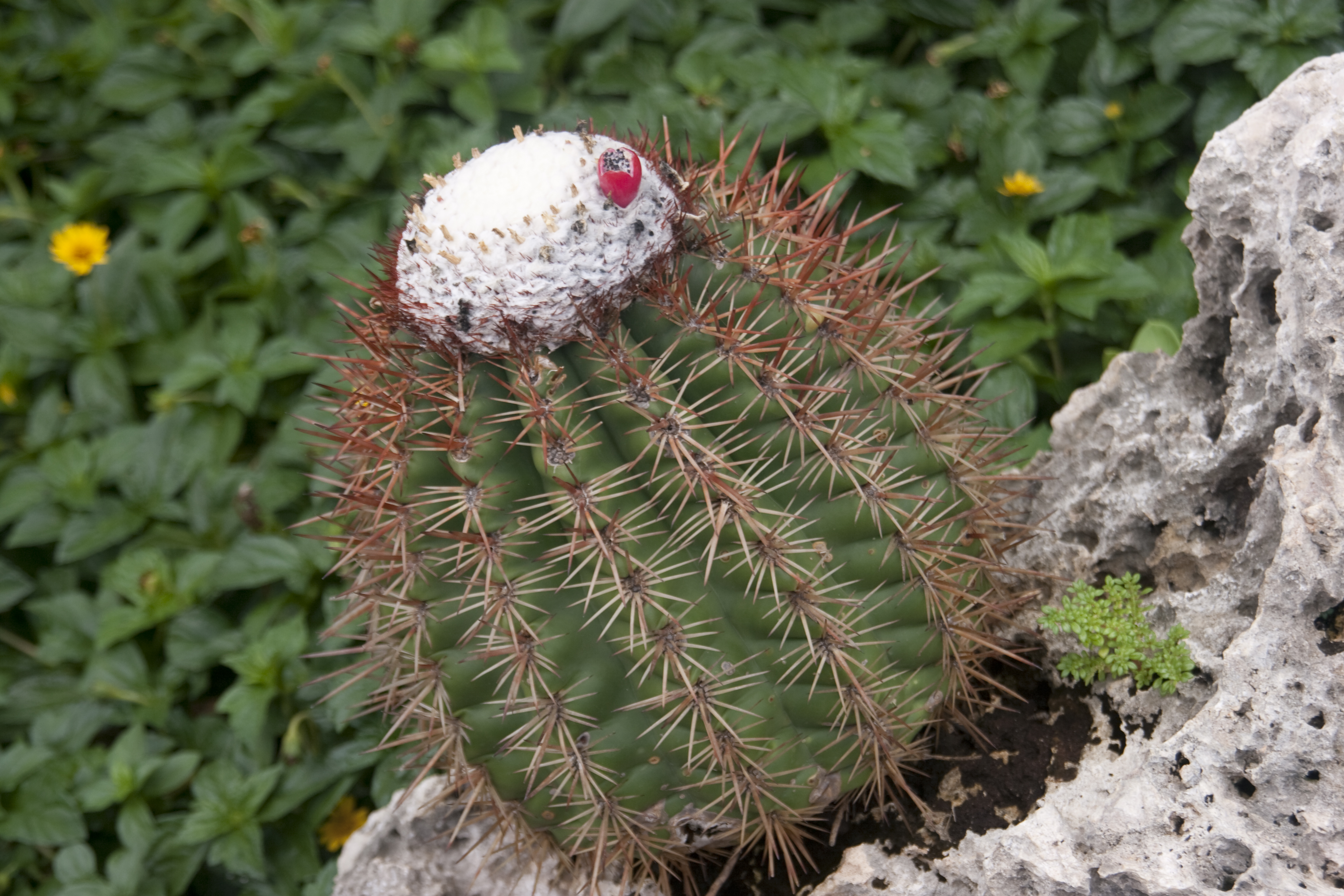
Melocactus macracanthos in Curaçao

== Fauna ==
Curaçao is semi-arid, and as such has not supported the numerous tropical species of mammals, birds, and lizards most associated with rainforests. Dozens of species of hummingbirds, bananaquits, orioles, and the larger terns, herons, egrets, and even flamingos make their homes near ponds or in coastal areas. The trupial, a black bird with a bright orange underbelly and white swatches on its wings, is common to Curaçao. The mockingbird, called chuchubi in Papiamentu, resembles the North American mockingbird, with a long white-grey tail and a grey back. Near shorelines, big-billed brown pelicans feed on fish. Other seabirds include several types of gulls and large cormorants.

Other than field mice, small rabbits, and cave bats, Curaçao's most notable animal is the white-tailed deer. This deer is related to the American white-tailed deer, or Virginia deer, found in areas from North America through Central America and the Caribbean, and as far south as Bolivia. It can be a large deer, some reaching six feet (2 m) in length and three feet (0.9 m) in height, and weighing as much as 300 pounds (140 kg). It has a long tail with a white underside, and is the only type of deer on the island. It has been a protected species since 1926, and an estimated 200 live on Curaçao. They're found in many parts of the island, but most notably at the west end's Christoffel Park, where about 70% of the herd resides. Archaeologists believe the deer were brought from South America to Curaçao by its original inhabitants, the Arawaks.

There are several species of iguana, light green in colour with shimmering shades of aqua along the belly and sides, found lounging in the sun across the island. The iguanas found on Curaçao serve not only as a scenic attraction but, unlike many islands that gave up the practice years ago, remain hunted for food. Along the west end of the island's north shore are several inlets that have become home to breeding sea turtles. These turtles are protected by the park system in Shete Boka Park, and can be visited accompanied by park rangers.

== Climate ==
Curaçao has a hot, semi-arid climate (Köppen climate classification BSh) with a dry season from January to September and a wet season from October to December. Rainfall is scarce, only 450 millimeters (18 inches) per year; in particular, the rainy season is drier than it normally is in tropical climates; during the dry season, it almost never rains. Owing to the scarcity of rainfall, the landscape of Curaçao is arid; especially on the north coast of the island. Temperatures are relatively constant, with small differences measured throughout the year. The trade winds cool the island during the day and warm it at night. The coolest month is January with an average temperature of 26.6 °C or 80 °F; the hottest is September with an average temperature of 29.1 °C or 84 °F. The year's average maximum temperature is 31.4 °C or 89 °F. The year's average temperature is 25.7 °C or 78 °F. The seawater around Curaçao averages around 27 °C (81 °F) and is coolest (avg. 25.9 °C [78.6 °F]) from February to March, and hottest (avg. 28.2 °C [82.8 °F]) from September to October.

Because Curaçao lies North of the Intertropical Convergence Zone and in an area of low-level divergence where winds flow parallel to the coast, its climate is much drier than expected for the northeastern side of a continent at its latitude. Rainfall is also extremely variable from year to year, being strongly linked to the El Niño Southern Oscillation. As little as 200 millimetres or 8 inches may fall in a strong El Niño year, but as much as 1,150 millimetres or 45 inches is not unknown in powerful La Niña years.

Curaçao lies outside the Main Development Region for Atlantic tropical cyclones, but is still occasionally affected by them, as with Hurricane Hazel in 1954, Anna in 1961, Felix in 2007, and Omar in 2008. Hurricane Hazel caused flash flooding in Curaçao, destroying a bridge and several water dams. It resulted in losses of $350,000 (1954 USD). No hurricane has made landfall in Curaçao since the US National Hurricane Center started tracking hurricanes. Curaçao has, however, been directly affected by pre-hurricane tropical storms several times; the latest being Hurricane Tomas in 2010, Cesar in 1996, Joan in 1988, Cora and Greta in 1978, Edith and Irene in 1971, and Francelia in 1969. Tomas brushed past Curaçao as a tropical storm, dropping as much as 265 mm (10.4 in) of rain on the island, nearly half its annual precipitation in a single day. This made Tomas one of the wettest events in the island's history, as well as one of the most devastating; its flooding killed two people and caused over NAƒ50 million (US$28 million) in damage.

According to the Emissions Database for Global Atmospheric Research, average carbon dioxide emissions per person on the island were 52 tonnes in 2018, the second highest in the world.

Climate data for Curaçao - Hato International airport (TNCC) (1981-2010)
Month	Jan	Feb	Mar	Apr	May	Jun	Jul	Aug	Sep	Oct	Nov	Dec	Year
Record high °C (°F)	33.3 (91.9)	33.2 (91.8)	33.0 (91.4)	34.7 (94.5)	36.0 (96.8)	37.5 (99.5)	35.0 (95.0)	37.4 (99.3)	38.3 (100.9)	36.0 (96.8)	35.6 (96.1)	33.3 (91.9)	38.3 (100.9)
Mean daily maximum °C (°F)	29.9 (85.8)	30.1 (86.2)	30.7 (87.3)	31.4 (88.5)	32.0 (89.6)	32.1 (89.8)	32.1 (89.8)	32.7 (90.9)	32.8 (91.0)	32.1 (89.8)	31.1 (88.0)	30.3 (86.5)	31.4 (88.5)
Daily mean °C (°F)	26.6 (79.9)	26.7 (80.1)	27.2 (81.0)	27.8 (82.0)	28.4 (83.1)	28.6 (83.5)	28.5 (83.3)	28.9 (84.0)	29.1 (84.4)	28.6 (83.5)	28.0 (82.4)	27.2 (81.0)	28.0 (82.4)
Mean daily minimum °C (°F)	24.4 (75.9)	24.5 (76.1)	24.9 (76.8)	25.6 (78.1)	26.3 (79.3)	26.5 (79.7)	26.1 (79.0)	26.5 (79.7)	26.6 (79.9)	26.2 (79.2)	25.6 (78.1)	24.9 (76.8)	25.7 (78.3)
Record low °C (°F)	21.5 (70.7)	20.6 (69.1)	21.3 (70.3)	22.0 (71.6)	21.6 (70.9)	22.4 (72.3)	22.3 (72.1)	21.3 (70.3)	22.7 (72.9)	21.9 (71.4)	22.0 (71.6)	21.6 (70.9)	20.6 (69.1)
Average rainfall mm (inches)	46.0 (1.81)	28.8 (1.13)	14.1 (0.56)	19.4 (0.76)	21.3 (0.84)	22.4 (0.88)	41.3 (1.63)	39.7 (1.56)	49.1 (1.93)	102.0 (4.02)	122.4 (4.82)	95.5 (3.76)	602 (23.7)
Average rainy days (≥ 1.0 mm)	8.5	5.5	2.5	2.4	2.2	3.3	6.4	4.6	4.7	8.1	10.9	11.4	70.5
Average relative humidity (%)	78.5	78.2	77.3	78.2	77.9	77.5	78.1	77.8	78.1	79.6	80.6	79.5	78.4
Mean monthly sunshine hours	264.7	249.6	271.8	249.4	266.3	266.7	290.4	302.5	261.7	247.8	234.7	247.1	3,152.7
Source: Meteorological Department Curacao

== Climate change ==
Average temperatures have risen sharply in the past 40 years in the Caribbean Netherlands and Curaçao has experienced more warm days and fewer cooler nights. The Intergovernmental Panel on Climate Change predicts that should air temperatures increase by 1.4 degrees, there will be a 5% to 6% decrease in rainfall, increased frequency and intensity of extreme weather events (including a 66% increase in hurricane intensity), and a 0.5- to 0.6-meter sea-level rise in the Caribbean Netherlands.

== Geology ==
The northern seabed drops steeply within 60 m (200 ft) of the Curaçaoan shore. This drop-off is known as the "blue edge".

On Curaçao, four major geological formations can be found: the lava formation, the Knip formation, the Mid-Curaçao formation and limestone formations.

Curaçao lies within the Caribbean large igneous province (CLIP) with key exposures of those lavas existing on the island consisting of the Curaçao Lava Formation (CLF). The CLF consists of 5 km of pillow lavas with some basalt intrusions. The ages of these rocks include 89 Ma for the lavas and 75 Ma for the poikilitic sills, though some sequences may have erupted as late as 62–66 Ma, placing them in the Cretaceous period. Their composition includes picrite pillows at the base, followed by tholeiitic lavas, then hyaloclastites, then the poikilitic sills. The CLF was gradually uplifted until Eocene-Miocene limestone caps formed, before final exposure above sea level. Christoffelberg and the Zevenbergen (Seven Hills) portion of the island have exposures of the Knip Formation. This formation includes deepwater deposits of calcareous sands and fine clays, capped by siliceous chert containing radiolarians. Middle Curaçao contains alluvial soils from eroded CLF and limestone.

== Beaches ==
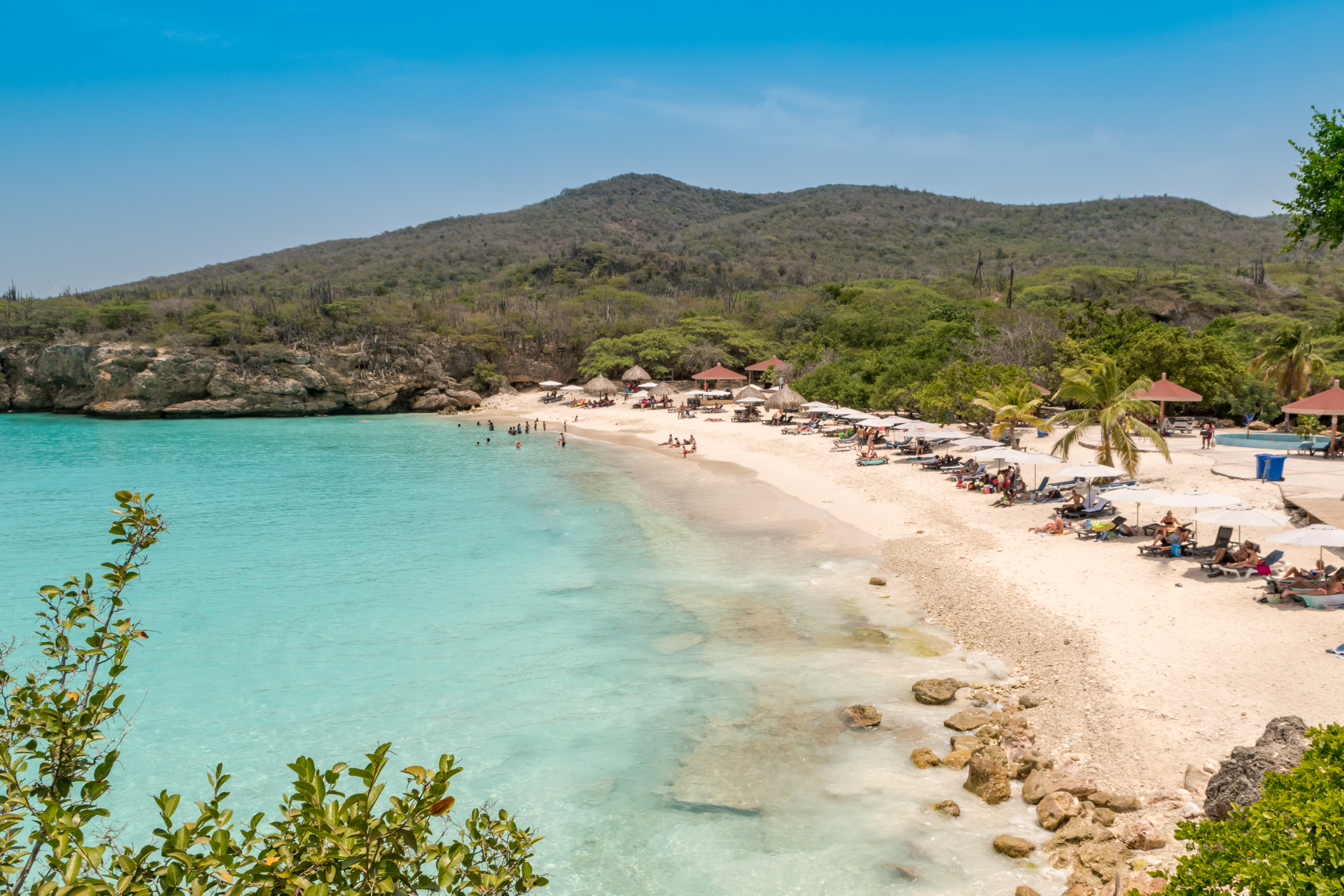
Grote Knip Beach

Curaçao has a large number of beaches. Most are on the south side of the island. The best known are:

- Baya Beach
- Blue Bay
- Boca Sami
- Daaibooi
- Grote Knip (Kenepa Grandi)
- Kleine Knip (Kenepa Chiki)
- Kokomo Beach
- Mambo Beach
- Piscaderabaai
- Playa Forti
- Playa Jeremi
- Playa Kas Abao
- Playa Kalki
- Playa Kanoa
- Playa Lagun
- Playa Porto Marie
- Playa Santa Cruz
- Playa Santa Barbara
- Seaquarium Beach
- Sint Michielsbaai
- Vaersenbaai
- Westpunt

Curaçao has a total of 37 beaches.

== See also ==
- Geography of Aruba
- Geography of Bonaire
