= Geography of North America =

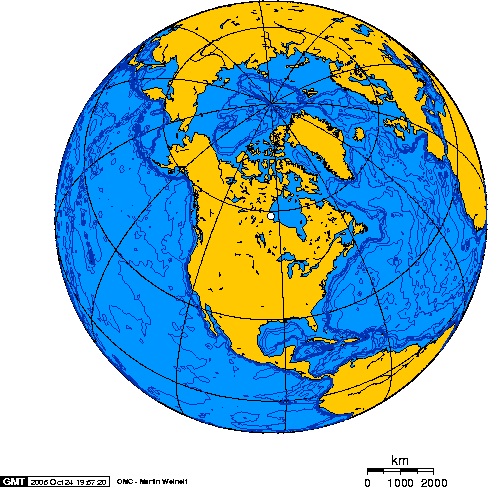
Global view centered on North America

North America is the third largest continent, and is also a portion of the second largest supercontinent if North and South America are combined into the Americas and Africa, Europe, and Asia are considered to be part of one supercontinent called Afro-Eurasia. With an estimated population of 580 million and an area of 24,709,000 km^{2} (9,540,000 mi^{2}), the northernmost of the two continents of the Western Hemisphere is bounded by the Pacific Ocean on the west; the Atlantic Ocean on the east; the Caribbean Sea on the south; and the Arctic Ocean on the north.

The northern half of North America is sparsely populated and covered mostly by Canada, except for the northeastern portion, which is occupied by Greenland, and the northwestern portion, which is occupied by Alaska, the largest state of the United States. The central and southern portions of the continent are occupied by the contiguous United States, Mexico, and numerous smaller states in Central America and in the Caribbean.

The continent is delimited on the southeast by most geographers at the Darién watershed along the Colombia-Panama border, placing all of Panama within North America. Alternatively, a less common view would end North America at the man-made Panama Canal. Islands generally associated with North America include Greenland, the world's largest island, and archipelagos and islands in the Caribbean. The terminology of the Americas is complex, but "Anglo-America" can describe Canada and the U.S., while "Latin America" comprises Mexico and the countries of Central America and the Caribbean, as well as the entire continent of South America.

Natural features of North America include the northern portion of the American Cordillera, represented by the geologically new Rocky Mountains in the west; and the considerably older Appalachian Mountains to the east. The north hosts an abundance of glacial lakes formed during the last glacial period, including the Great Lakes. North America's major continental divide is the Great Divide, which runs north and south down through Rocky Mountains. The major watersheds draining to the include the Mississippi/Missouri and Rio Grande draining into the Gulf of Mexico (part of the Atlantic Ocean), and the St. Lawrence draining into the Atlantic. The Colorado, Colombia, and Yukon Rivers drain west to the Pacific Ocean.

Climate is determined to a large extent by the latitude, ranging from Arctic cold in the north to tropical heat in the south. There are steppes (known as "prairies") in the central and western portions, and deserts in the Southwestern United States of Arizona, Colorado, California, Nevada, New Mexico, Utah, and Texas; along with the Mexican states of Baja California, Baja California Sur, Sonora, Chihuahua, Coahuila, Nuevo Leon and Tamaulipas.

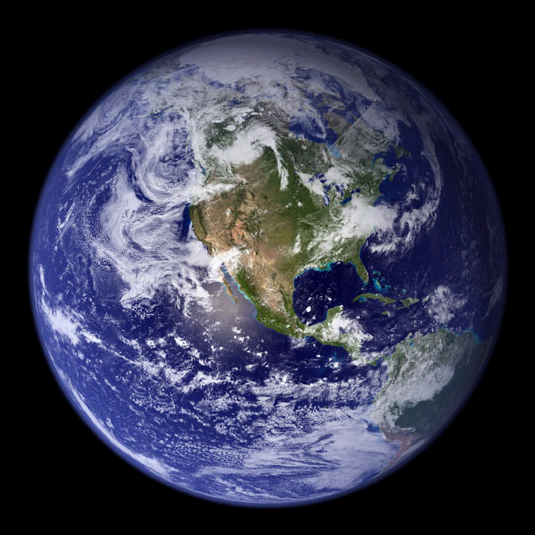
The Blue Marble, NASA; more rain east than west .

== Paleogeography ==
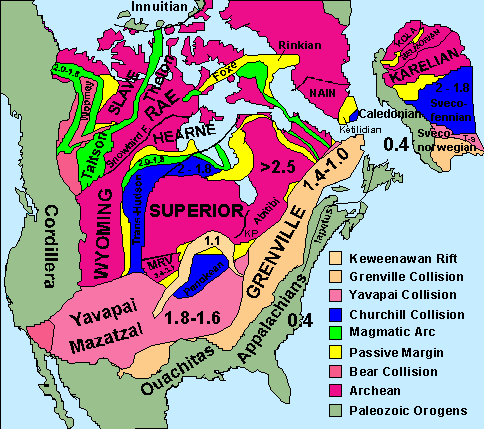
The paleogeological origins of the basement rocks underlying North America.

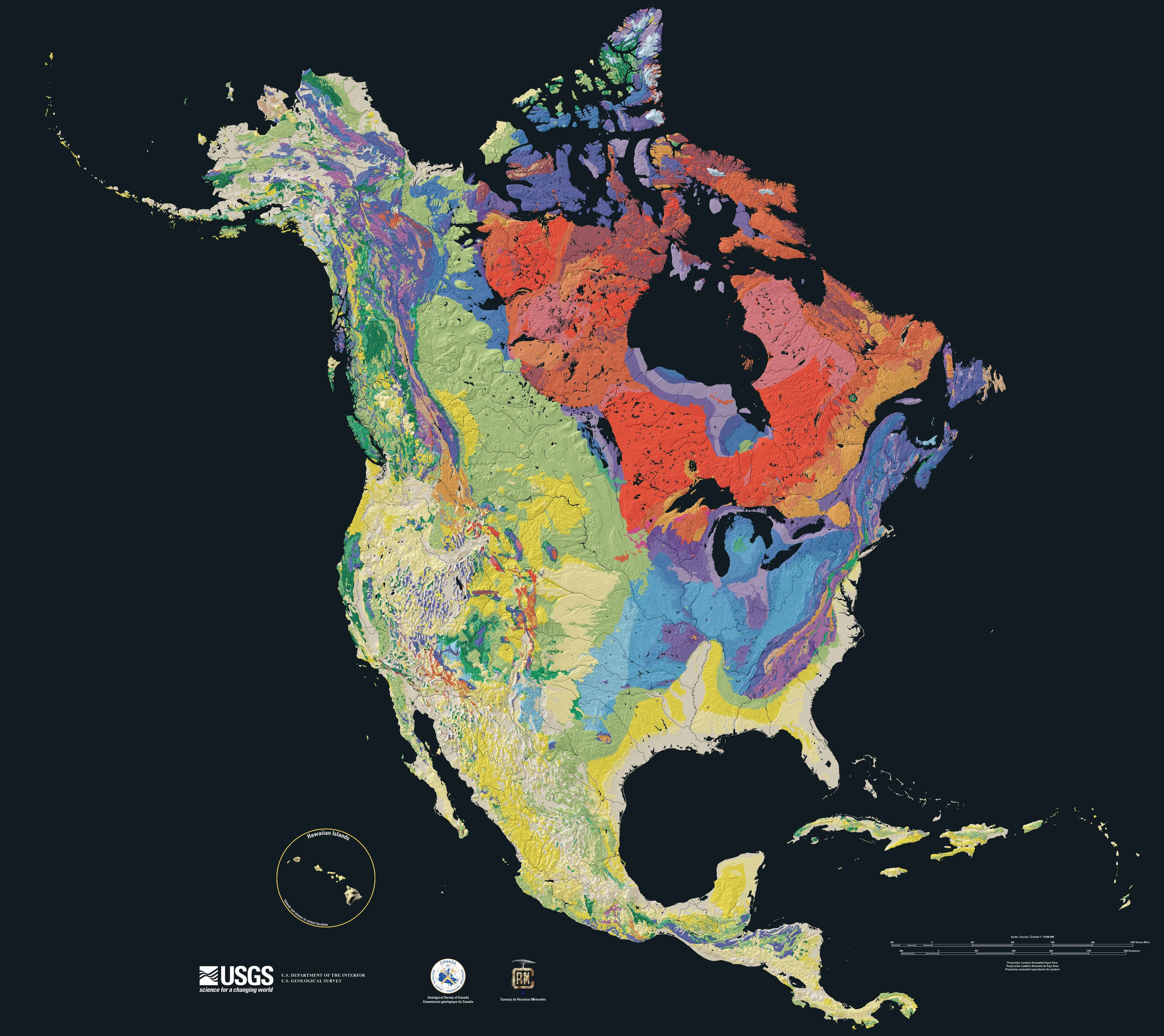
Age of the bedrock underlying North America, from red (oldest) to blue, green, yellow (newest).

Seventy percent of North America is underlain by the Laurentia craton, which is exposed as the Canadian Shield in much of central and eastern Canada around the Hudson Bay, and as far south as the U.S. states of Michigan, Wisconsin, and Minnesota. The continental crust started to form 4 billion years ago (Ga), and six of the microcontinents collided to form the craton about 2 Ga. This core has been enlarged by plate tectonics, most notably between 1.8 and 1.65 Ga when a piece currently stretching from Arizona to Missouri fused with the south and west portion of the craton. The craton started to rift about 1.1 Ga, and the fissure (now the Midcontinent Rift System) ran between Kansas and Lake Superior before stopping, perhaps due to the Grenville collision in the east. Otherwise the craton has remained relatively stable, with some rocks dating from 2.5 to 4 Ga, including what may be the world's oldest known rock: Specimens from the Nuvvuagittuq greenstone belt on the coast of the Hudson Bay have been dated to 4.38 Ga, though the dating methods are disputed. Periodic flooding by inland seas, most recently the Western Interior Seaway during the Cretaceous, caused the layer of sedimentary rock over the remainder of the craton. The Laurentia craton is the center of the Proterozoic supercontinent Rodinia in most models, and was also part of the later Laurussia, Pangea, and Laurasia supercontinents.

Roughly 3 million years ago (Ma), the volcanic Isthmus of Panama formed between the North and South American continents creating a bridge over what was the Central American Seaway and allowing the migration of flora and fauna between the two landmasses in the Great American Interchange. Starting 2.58 Ma, the Quaternary glaciation covered much of the continent with ice, centered west of Hudson Bay, the floor of which is slowly rebounding after being depressed by the great weight of the ice. Glaciers descended the slopes of the Rocky Mountains and those of the Pacific Margin. Extensive glacial lakes, such as Glacial Lake Missoula, Bonneville, Lahontan, Agassiz, and Algonquin, formed by glacial melt water. "Remnants of them are still visible in the Great Basin and along the edge of the Canadian Shield in the form of the Great Salt Lake, the Great Lakes, and the large lakes of west central Canada." The last glacial period of the current ice age caused a lowering of the sea level, exposing the Bering Land Bridge between Alaska and Siberia, which resulted in human migration from Asia to the Americas between 40,000 and 15,000 years ago.

North America can also be divided into four great regions:

- Great Plains: stretching from the Gulf of Mexico to the Canadian Arctic;
- the geologically young, mountainous west: including the Rocky Mountains, the Great Basin, California and Alaska;
- the raised but relatively flat plateau of the Canadian Shield in the northeast;
- the varied eastern region: including the Appalachian Mountains, the coastal plain of the Atlantic Seaboard, and the Florida peninsula.

Mexico and its long plateaus and cordilleras fall largely in the western region, although the eastern coastal plain does extend south along the Gulf.

North American Plate (center top) Caribbean Plate (center)

== Physiography ==
North America may be divided into at least five major physiographic regions:

Canadian Shield
This is a geologically stable area of rock dating between 2.5 and 4 Gya that occupies most of the northeastern quadrant, including Greenland.

Appalachian Mountains
The Appalachians are an old and eroded system that formed about 1.3 Gya and extends from the Island of Newfoundland to Alabama.

Atlantic Coastal Plain
The plain is a belt of lowlands widening to the south that extends from south New England to Mexico.

Interior Lowlands
The lowlands extend down the middle of the continent from the Mackenzie Valley to the Atlantic Coastal Plain, and include the Great Plains on the west and the agriculturally productive Interior Plains on the east.

North American Cordillera
The cordillera is a complex belt of mountains and associated plateaus and basins some of which were formed as recently as 100–65 Ma, during the Cretaceous. The cordillera extend from Alaska into Mexico and includes two orogenic belts — the Pacific Margin on the west and the Rocky Mountains on the east — separated by a system of intermontane plateaus and basins.

The Coastal Plain and the main belts of the North American Cordillera continue in the south in Mexico (where the Mexican Plateau, bordered by the Sierra Madre Oriental and the Sierra Madre Occidental, is considered a continuation of the intermontane system) to connect the Transverse Volcanic Range, a zone of high and active volcanic peaks south of Mexico City.

The vast majority of North America is located on the North American Plate, centered on the Laurentia craton. Parts of California and western Mexico form the partial edge of the Pacific Plate; the two plates meet along the San Andreas Fault. The southern portion of the Caribbean and parts of Central America compose the much smaller Caribbean Plate.

The western mountains have split in the middle, into the main range of the Rockies and the Coast Ranges in California, Oregon, Washington, and British Columbia with the Great Basin (a lower area containing smaller ranges and low-lying deserts) in between. The highest peak is Denali (also called Mount McKinley) in Alaska.

Three countries (Canada, the United States, and Mexico) make up most of North America's land mass; they share the continent with 34 other island countries in the Caribbean and south of Mexico.

=== Geographic center of North America ===
The geographic center of North America is near Center, North Dakota, according to Peter Rogerson, geography professor at the University at Buffalo, who published a new method of calculating geographical centers.

Earlier placements in 1931 involved geographers balancing a cardboard cutout of a region on a needlelike point to find its center to establish a spot "6 miles west of Balta, Pierce County, North Dakota", at 48⁰ 10′north, 100⁰ 10′west. In 1932, a field stone cairn recognizing this was erected in nearby Rugby, North Dakota at the intersections of U.S. Route 2 and ND State Highway 3.

== Surface and climate ==
Landforms and land cover of North America

The Great Plains

The Great Plains is the broad expanse of prairie and steppe which lies east of the Rocky Mountains in the United States and Canada. The narrow plains in the Mexican coast and the savannas of the Mississippi are analogous to, respectively, the Patagonian Steppes and the pampas of the Piranha, Paraguay, and Rio de la Plata. Thus the Appalachians and the mountain chains of Brazil are regarded as creating similar interruptions to the plains community.

North America extends to within 10° of latitude of both the equator and the North Pole. It embraces every climatic zone, from tropical rain forest and savanna on the lowlands of Central America to areas of permanent ice cap in central Greenland. Subarctic and tundra climates prevail in north Canada and north Alaska, and desert and semiarid conditions are found in interior regions cut off by high mountains from rain-bearing westerly winds. However, most of the continent has temperate climates very favorable to settlement and agriculture. Prairies, or vast grasslands cover a huge amount in mountain ranges.

=== North America's greatest snowfalls ===
Greatest Snowfalls
	Places	Date	Inches	Centimeters
24 hours	Silver Lake, Colorado	April 14–15, 1921	76	195.6
1 month	Tamarack, California	January 1911	390	991
One storm	Mt. Shasta Ski Bowl, Calif.	February 13–19, 1959	189	480
One season	Mount Baker, WA	1998–1999	1, 140	2, 895.6

=== Hydrography and deserts ===
The average rainfall in North America is 76 cm/year, which produces some 18 petaliters of water.

==== River systems ====
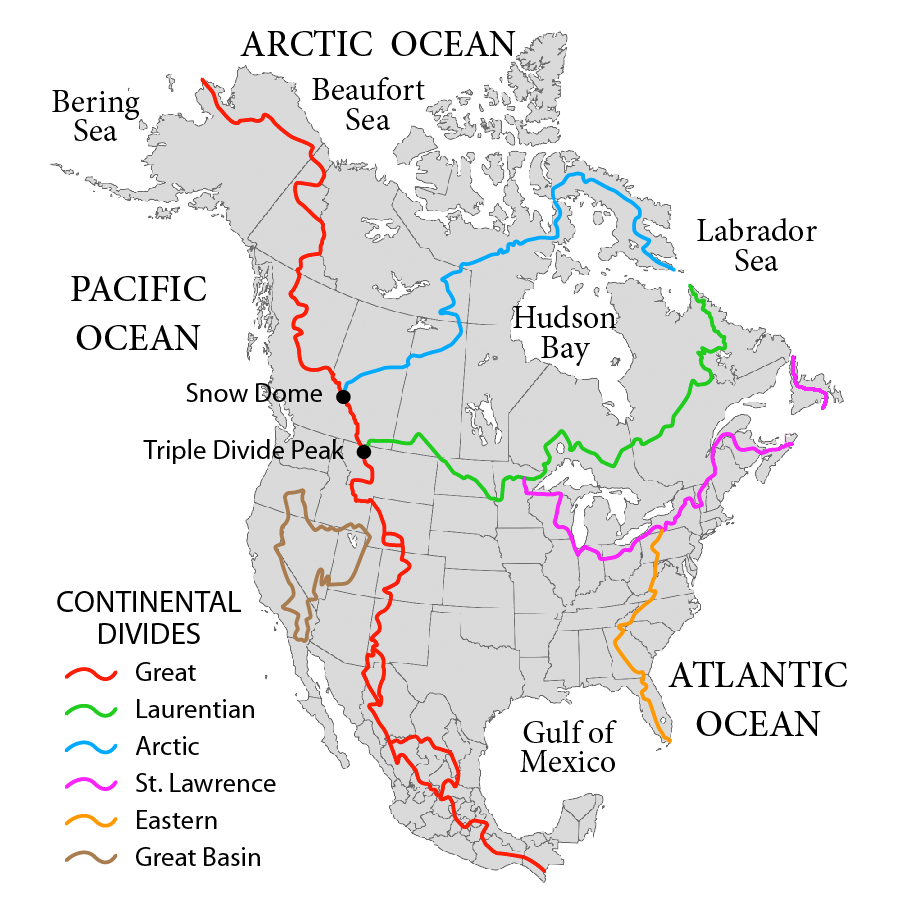
North American Watersheds (Atlantic, Arctic, Great Basin, & Pacific)

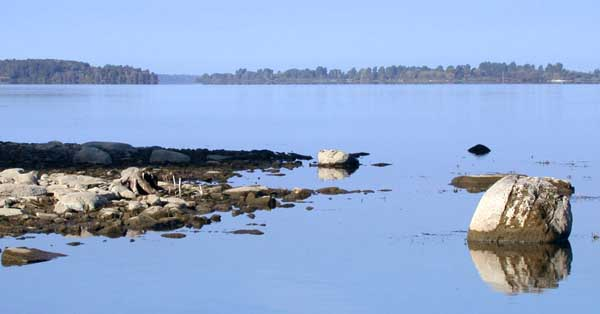
Saint Lawrence River on the New York–Ontario border

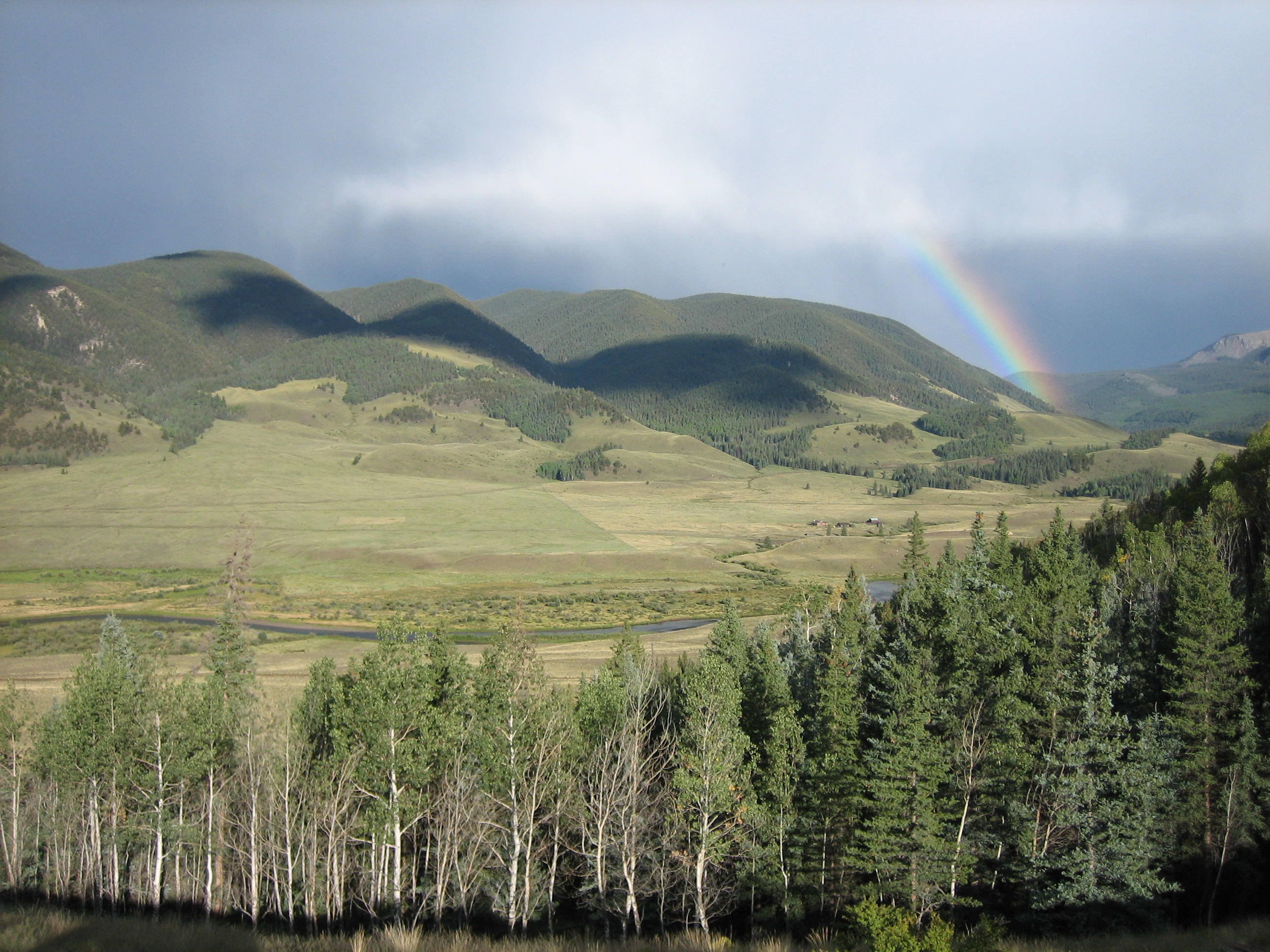
The Upper Rio Grande by Creede, Colorado

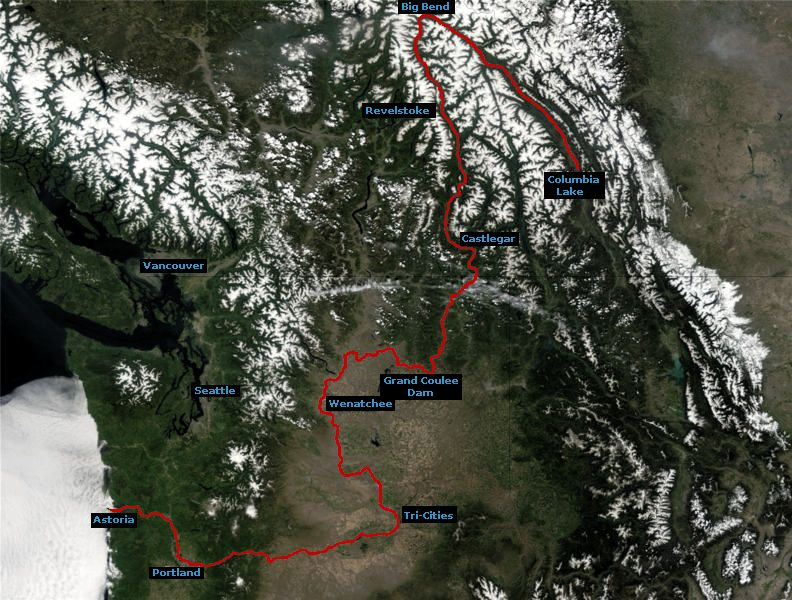
The Columbia River from Canada to the Pacific

Listed below by watershed are some of the more notable rivers in North America. Rivers flow entirely within the United States, unless otherwise noted.

- Atlantic Ocean watershed
  - Churchill River (Atlantic) 856 mi (1,378 km) (in Canada)
  - Churchill River (Hudson Bay) 1,000 mi (1,600 km), flows to Hudson Bay and then connects to Labrador Sea and Atlantic Ocean (in Canada)
  - Connecticut River 410 mi (660 km)
  - Delaware 301 mi (484 km)
  - Hudson River 315 mi (507 km)
  - James River (Virginia) 348 mi (560 km)
  - Potomac River 405 mi (652 km)
  - Savannah River 301 mi (484 km)
  - Susquehanna River 444 mi (715 km)
  - St. Johns River 310 mi (500 km)
  - St. Lawrence River 310 mi (500 km)
- Atlantic Ocean through the Caribbean Sea
  - Artibonite River 199 mi (320 km) (in Haiti and Dominican Republic)
  - Cauto River 230 mi (370 km) (in Cuba)
- Atlantic Ocean through the Gulf of Mexico watershed
  - Allegheny River 325 mi (523 km)
  - Arkansas River 1,469 mi (2,364 km)
  - Brazos River 1,352 mi (2,176 km)
  - Grijalva River 300 mi (480 km) (in Mexico)
  - Mississippi 2,320 mi (3,730 km)
  - Missouri River 2,321 mi (3,735 km)
  - Ohio River 981 mi (1,579 km)
  - Pecos River 926 mi (1,490 km)
  - Red River of the South 1,360 mi (2,190 km)
  - Tennessee River 652 mi (1,049 km)
  - Rio Grande 1,896 mi (3,051 km) (in Mexico and U.S.)
  - Usumacinta River 620 mi (1,000 km) (in Guatemala and Mexico)
- Arctic Ocean watershed
  - Albany River (in Canada) 610 mi (980 km)
  - Mackenzie River 2,635 mi (4,241 km) longest river in Canada, (flows through the Beaufort Sea in Canada)
  - Nelson River 1,600 mi (2,600 km) (in Canada)
  - Severn River (northern Ontario) 982 mi (1,580 km) (in Canada)
  - Saint John River (New Brunswick) (in Canada)
- Pacific Ocean watershed
  - Balsas River (in Mexico)
  - Columbia River
  - Fraser River (in Canada)
  - Lerma River (in Mexico)
  - Sacramento River
  - San Joaquin River
  - Snake River 1,078 mi (1,735 km)
  - Suchiate River (in Guatemala and Mexico)
  - Yukon River (in Canada and U.S.)
- Pacific Ocean through the Bering Sea
  - Kuskokwim River 702 mi (1,130 km)
- Pacific Ocean through the Gulf of California
  - Colorado River 862 mi (1,387 km) (Mexico and U.S.)
  - Fuerte River (in Mexico)
- Great Basin watershed (does not reach oceans)
  - Bear River 350 mi (560 km)
  - Humboldt River 290 mi (470 km)
  - Sevier River 385 mi (620 km)

North America map of Köppen climate classification.

== Climate and vegetation ==
There are various plant life distributions in North America. Plant life in the Arctic includes grasses, mosses, and Arctic willows. Coniferous trees, including spruces, pines, hemlocks, and firs, are indigenous to the Canadian and Western U.S. mountain ranges as far south as San Francisco. Among these are giant sequoias, redwoods, great firs, and sugar pines. Sugar pines are generally confined to the northwestern area of the United States. The central region of the country has hardwoods. Southern states grow extensive yellow pines. In addition, mahogany, logwood, and lignumvitae - all tropical in nature - are grown. The southwest has desert plants, including yucca and cacti. The cultivated native plants of North America are tobacco, maize, vanilla, melons, cacao, gourds, indigo plant, and beans.

=== Deserts ===
The Sierra Nevada and Cascade mountain ranges run along the entire Pacific Coast, acting as a barrier to the humid winds that sweep in from the ocean. The rising topography forces this air upwards, causing moisture to condense and fall in the form of rain on the western slopes of the mountains, with some areas receiving more than 70 inches (1.8 m) of rainfall per year. As a result, the air has lost much of its moisture and becomes hot and dry when it reaches the areas east of the coastal mountain ranges. These arid conditions are, in some instances, exacerbated in regions of extremely low altitude (some near or below sea level) by higher air pressure, resulting in drier conditions and adiabatic heating effects, some of these pocket deserts exist in valleys well north of the Canada–US border in interior British Columbia. What precipitation does fall generally does not last long, lost primarily to evaporation, as well as rapid runoff and efficient water uptake and storage by native vegetation.

Major habitat types of the United States and Canada	Ecoregions map of Canada, United States and Mexico

== Zoology ==
North America is home to many native mammal species. Several species of deer, including elk, caribou, moose, mule deer, and the abundant white-tailed deer are found throughout various regions, along with the bison in the central plains and the musk ox in the Arctic tundra. Three species of bear, several subspecies of wolf, and various other carnivores such as raccoons, skunks, and cats including cougars and lynxes are widely distributed. The family Mustelidae is well represented, including badgers, otters, ferrets, and wolverines. Numerous species of squirrels and other rodents, such as beavers and muskrats, can be found in virtually every region of the continent. Central America has adapted sloths, anteaters, and armadillos. Other animals includes the California condor, mostly found in California, the parrots and the monkeys of Tropical forests, the humming bird, rattlesnake, alligator, and Cayman of the banks of the streams, and swarms of mosquitoes on the wide plains.

== Mining and petroleum ==
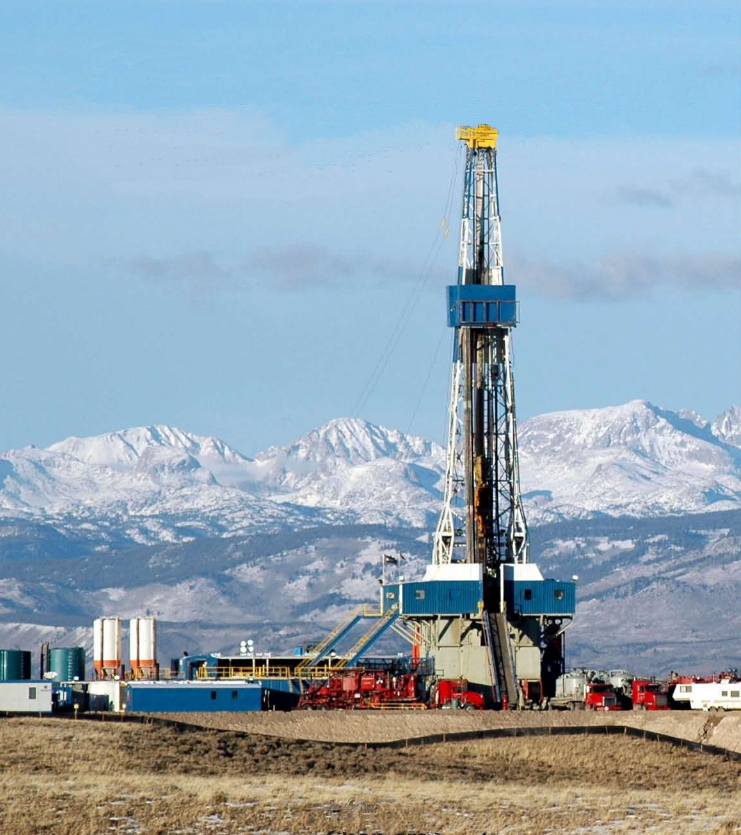
Natural gas drilling rig in Wyoming

The mining and petroleum industries are important in Canada, the United States and Mexico. These natural resources make the region one of the richest on the earth.

=== Rocky Mountains ===
The Rocky Mountain region is known for vast resources and rich mineral deposits including copper, lead, gold, silver, tungsten or Wolfram, uranium, zinc and Coal, petroleum and natural gas are mineral fuels found. Old mine tailings are present in the Rocky Mountain landscape.

== Agriculture and forestry ==
Agriculture and forestry are two major industries. Agriculture includes arid land and irrigated farming and livestock grazing. Livestock are often moved between high-elevation summer pastures and low-elevation and winter pastures.

== See also ==
- Geography of North America
  - Geography of Canada
  - Geography of the Caribbean
    - Geography of Anguilla
    - Geography of Antigua and Barbuda
    - Geography of Aruba
    - Geography of Barbados
    - Geography of Bonaire
    - Geography of the British Virgin Islands
    - Geography of the Cayman Islands
    - Geography of Cuba
    - Geography of Curaçao
    - Geography of Dominica
    - Geography of the Dominican Republic
    - Geography of Grenada
    - Geography of Guadeloupe
    - Geography of Haiti
    - Geography of Jamaica
    - Geography of Martinique
    - Geography of Montserrat
    - Geography of Puerto Rico
    - Geography of Saba
    - Geography of Saint Barthélemy
    - Geography of Saint Kitts and Nevis
    - Geography of Saint Lucia
    - Geography of Saint Martin
    - Geography of Saint Vincent and the Grenadines
    - Geography of Sint Eustatius
    - Geography of Sint Maarten
    - Geography of Trinidad and Tobago
    - Geography of the United States Virgin Islands
  - Geography of Central America
    - Geography of Belize
    - Geography of Costa Rica
    - Geography of El Salvador
    - Geography of Guatemala
    - Geography of Honduras
    - Geography of Nicaragua
    - Geography of Panama
  - Geography of Greenland
  - Geography of the Lucayan Archipelago
    - Geography of the Bahamas
    - Geography of the Turks and Caicos Islands
  - Geography of Mexico
  - Geography of the United States
- Geology of North America
- List of mountain peaks of North America
- List of rivers of the Americas by coastline
- Transportation in North America

== Bibliography ==
Map and aerial photos

- North America map
- Physical map
- Map of the Great Lakes
- North American map
- North America Political map
- Oldest Human Remains in North America Found
- T. H. Clark and C. W. Stearn, The Geological Evolution of North America (1968)
- W. P. Cumming et al., The Discovery of North America (1972)
- R. C. West et al., Middle America: Its Lands and Peoples (3d ed. 1989)
- T. L. McKnight, Regional Geography of the United States and Canada (1992)
- S. Birdsall, Regional Landscapes of the United States and Canada (4th rev. ed. 1992)
- T. Flannery, The Eternal Frontier: An Ecological History of North America and Its Peoples (2001)
- A. Taylor, American Colonies (2001).
