= Interior Lowlands =

Interior Lowlands is a description of a large region of mainly flat land and may refer to:

- Interior Lowlands of North America, see Geography of North America § Interior Lowlands

== See also ==
- Interior Plains
- Interior Low Plateaus
