= Curaçao Tourist Board =

National tourism marketing and management organization of Curaçao

- Curaçao Toeristen Bureau (Dutch); Oficina de Turismo de Curazao (Spanish)

Agency overview
- Formed: 1915 (historical committees); 1989 (modern statutory foundation)
- Jurisdiction: Curaçao
- Headquarters: Pietermaai 19, Willemstad, Curaçao
- Annual budget: Funded via local lodging tax (logeerbelasting) and national budget allocations
- Minister responsible: Ruisandro Cijntje, Minister of Economic Development
- Agency executive: Muryad de Bruin, Managing Director
- Website: www.curacao.com

The Curaçao Tourist Board (CTB) is the official public-private destination marketing and management organization (DMMO) for the autonomous country of Curaçao within the Kingdom of the Netherlands. Operating under the political responsibility of the Ministry of Economic Development (MEO), the CTB executes international tourism marketing campaigns, establishes sustainable product development frameworks, manages airlift capacity negotiations, and oversees human capital growth initiatives within the domestic hospitality sector.

The legal entity backing the operations of the board is the Curaçao Tourism Development Foundation (CTDF). The modern CTB acts as a strategic architect, shifting from a traditional destination marketing board into a comprehensive management body that balances macroeconomic targets with the island's environmental and social carrying capacities.

== History and evolution ==
The origins of institutionalized tourism promotion in Curaçao date back to the early 20th century. Following the establishment of the Royal Dutch Shell oil refinery in 1915, the island's economy shifted drastically toward industrial petroleum refining. Early civic groups and colonial administrators established basic promotional committees to cultivate a supplementary leisure market, leveraging the island's colonial Dutch architecture and protected marine environments.

As global industrial patterns shifted in the late 20th century, the Government of Curaçao sought structural economic diversification. In 1989, the state consolidated its disjointed promotional bodies into the Curaçao Tourism Development Foundation (CTDF). Over the subsequent decades, this entity scaled its international footprint, establishing dedicated regional offices in North America, Western Europe, and South America to mitigate vulnerability to single-market downturns.

== Governance and financing ==
The CTB is structured as a public-private framework to ensure commercial agility while maintaining strict compliance with national economic goals.

=== Board structure ===
The organization is governed by a multi-stakeholder Supervisory Board. Directors are appointed to represent a cross-section of public ministries and primary private-sector stakeholders, including:

- The Ministry of Economic Development (MEO)
- The Ministry of Finance
- The Curaçao Hospitality and Tourism Association (CHATA)
- The Curaçao Chamber of Commerce & Industry

=== Funding mechanism ===
The operational, administrative, and international promotional budgets of the CTB are primarily funded through a dedicated statutory room tax (logeerbelasting) levied on tourist accommodations across the island, supplemented by direct legislative subsidies earmarked within the national budget.

== Strategic pillars ==
The CTB operates under multi-annual frameworks outlined within the national Strategic Tourism Master Plan. The board's operations are divided into four primary areas of execution:

=== Global marketing and brand positioning ===
The CTB controls the global deployment of the island's corporate identity. Marketing resources are allocated systematically across four distinct source markets:

- Europe: Focused heavily on the Netherlands, with secondary pipelines developed in Germany and Belgium.
- North America: Focused on the United States and Canada, specifically target-marketing eastern and southern commercial aviation hubs.
- South America: Centered on Colombia, Brazil, and the historical pathways of Venezuela.
- Caribbean: Niche marketing targeting regional business travel, retail events, and cultural festivals.

=== Airlift and maritime connectivity ===
The CTB operates a specialized Airlift Committee that works alongside Curaçao International Airport (Hato) and Curaçao Airport Partners (CAP). This committee negotiates directly with international legacy airlines to establish new routes, optimize weekly flight frequencies, and guarantee seat capacity minimums. In tandem with the Curaçao Ports Authority (CPA), the CTB coordinates arrival schedules and port marketing for global cruise lines utilizing the Mega Pier complexes in Willemstad.

=== Product development and environmental monitoring ===
To safeguard the local ecological baseline, the CTB invests in land-based and marine infrastructure management. This includes the upgrade of public beaches, historical site preservation, and the implementation of visitor safety protocols. The product development division evaluates geographic carrying capacities, modeling the impact of heavy tourist traffic on delicate marine zones, such as the narrow insular shelf known as the "Blue Edge."

=== Human capital and community integration ===
The board designs and funds localized hospitality training seminars to improve service metrics across the island. These initiatives are tailored to build professional workforce capacity among the local Kurasoleño population, certifying tour operators, offering hospitality tracks in secondary education, and fostering broad-scale public awareness of the tourism economy.

== Business intelligence and metrics ==
The CTB operates an internal data analytics division that tracks regional economic indicators. By processing the mandatory digital immigration card (DI Card) completed by all foreign arrivals, the board compiles real-time demographic and fiscal intelligence.

The metrics collected and released in the annual State of the Industry Report show that Curaçao welcomed 700,242 stayover arrivals in 2024, surging 13% to reach 788,427 in 2025, with the CTB targeting 846,000 stayover visitors for 2026.

== See also ==
- Economy of Curaçao
- Geography of Curaçao
