= Cliff Villa Peninsula =

Promontory in Bandabou, Curaçao

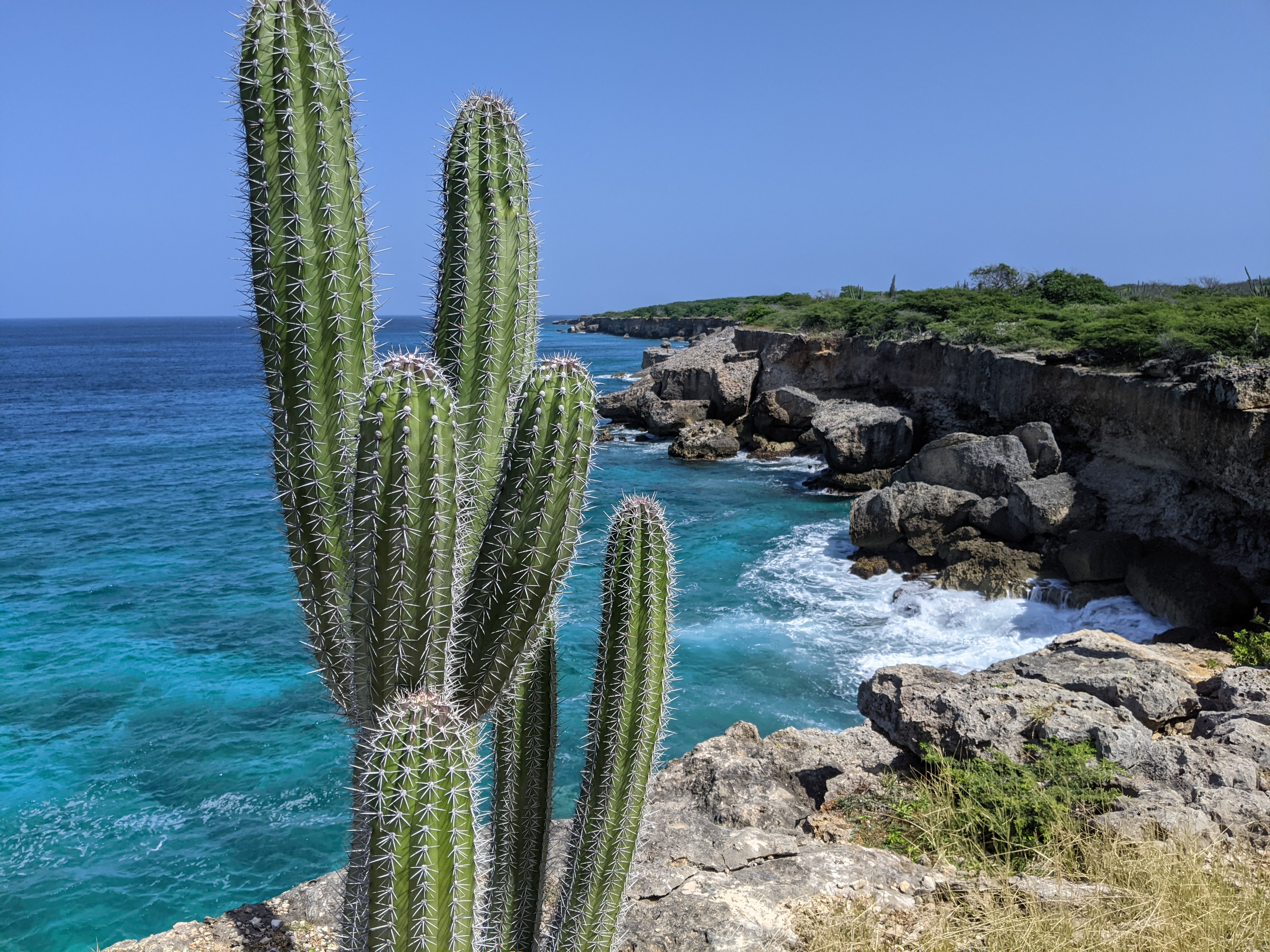
- View from Cliff Villa Peninsula north of Watamula

- Location in Curaçao
- Coordinates: 12°22′55.1″N 69°09′42.9″W
- Country: Curaçao
- District: Bandabou
- Town: Westpunt
- Climate: BSh

The Cliff Villa Peninsula (Klif Villa Schiereiland) is a promontory where two currents meet on the north-westerly point of the island of Curaçao (a country within the Kingdom of the Netherlands in the Caribbean).

Cliff Villa Peninsula is known to be the premier dive destination for drift diving in the region. The two currents stir the nutrients in the waters 40 ft under the Cliff Villa. This turbulent water is called Watamula which comes from the Dutch word Watermolen meaning “water mill.”

The Curaçao government has taken steps to protect the site. Spear fishing and breaking or removing shell or coral is strictly prohibited. A coral bleaching event in Curaçao in 2010 recorded a loss of 1% of its living corals. Corals near Westpunt were most heavily impacted with 10% affected.

Cliff Villa is also an artisanal fishing location targeting pelagic and demersal species. Fish species with the highest market value that are caught in this area include wahoo, mahi mahi, Yellowfin tuna, Blackfin tuna, queen snapper and grouper. Carnivorous fishes are found in low abundance across all zones of Curaçao. There is no shortage of damselfish and lionfish (an invasive species) which inflict significant damage to native reef communities and corals.

Cliff Villa Peninsula is a refuge for Melocactus also called Milon di Seru (Dutch) or Bushi (Papiamentu) which grows in abundance on the cliff. The cactus has an extensive root system that threads through the lime rock. Pulling the cactus up will break the root system and cause the plant to die. The cactus is native to the Caribbean and South-Central American region. Melocactus has approximately 40 species.

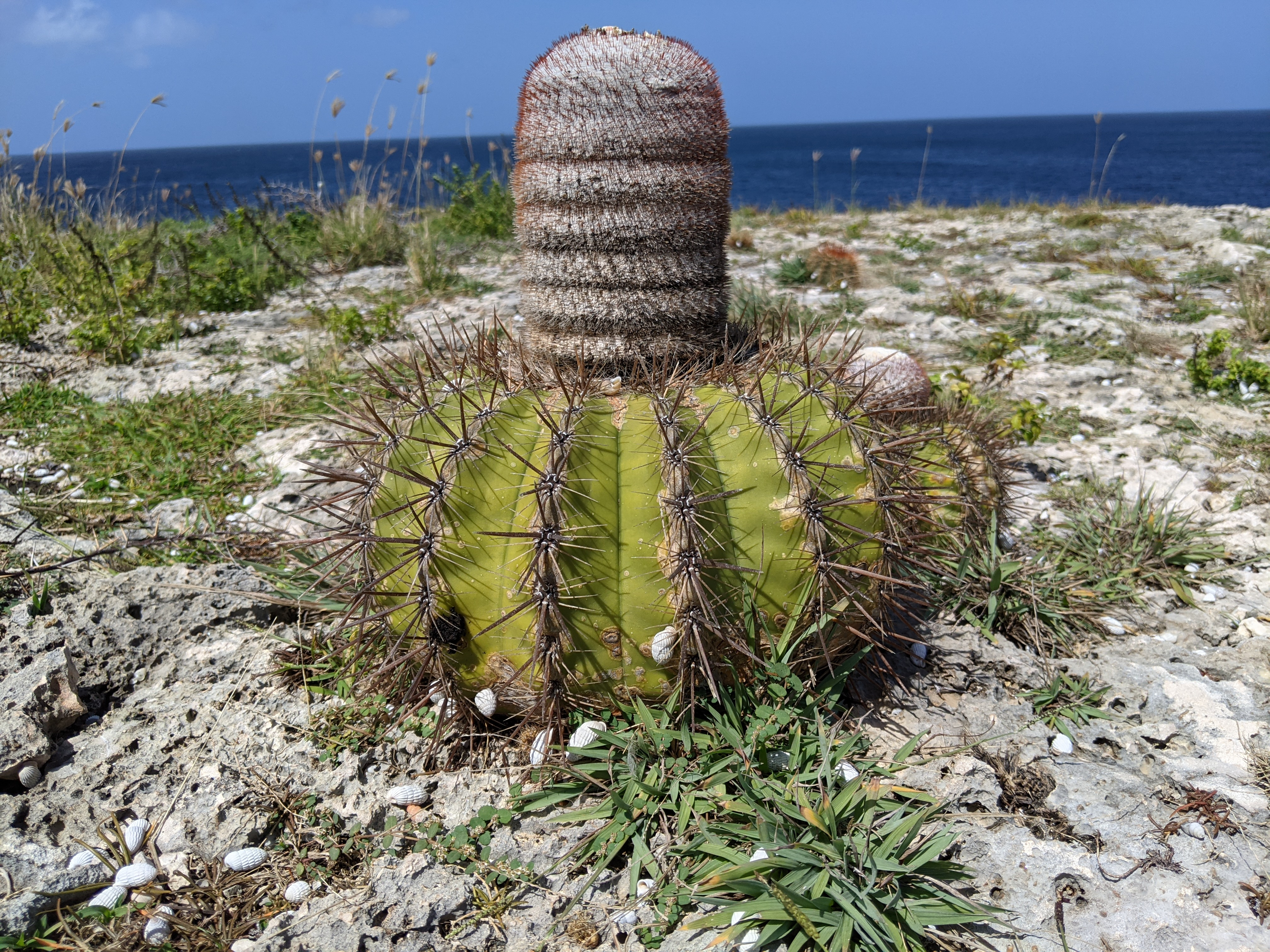
Melocactus Refuge on the Peninsula

Cliff Villa Peninsula is located in the center of the Watamula nature preserve. Watamula north of Cliff Villa Peninsula is part of a larger network of parks which will be connected by ecological corridors.
