= Watamula =

Point in Curaçao

Coordinates: 12°23′N 69°09′W

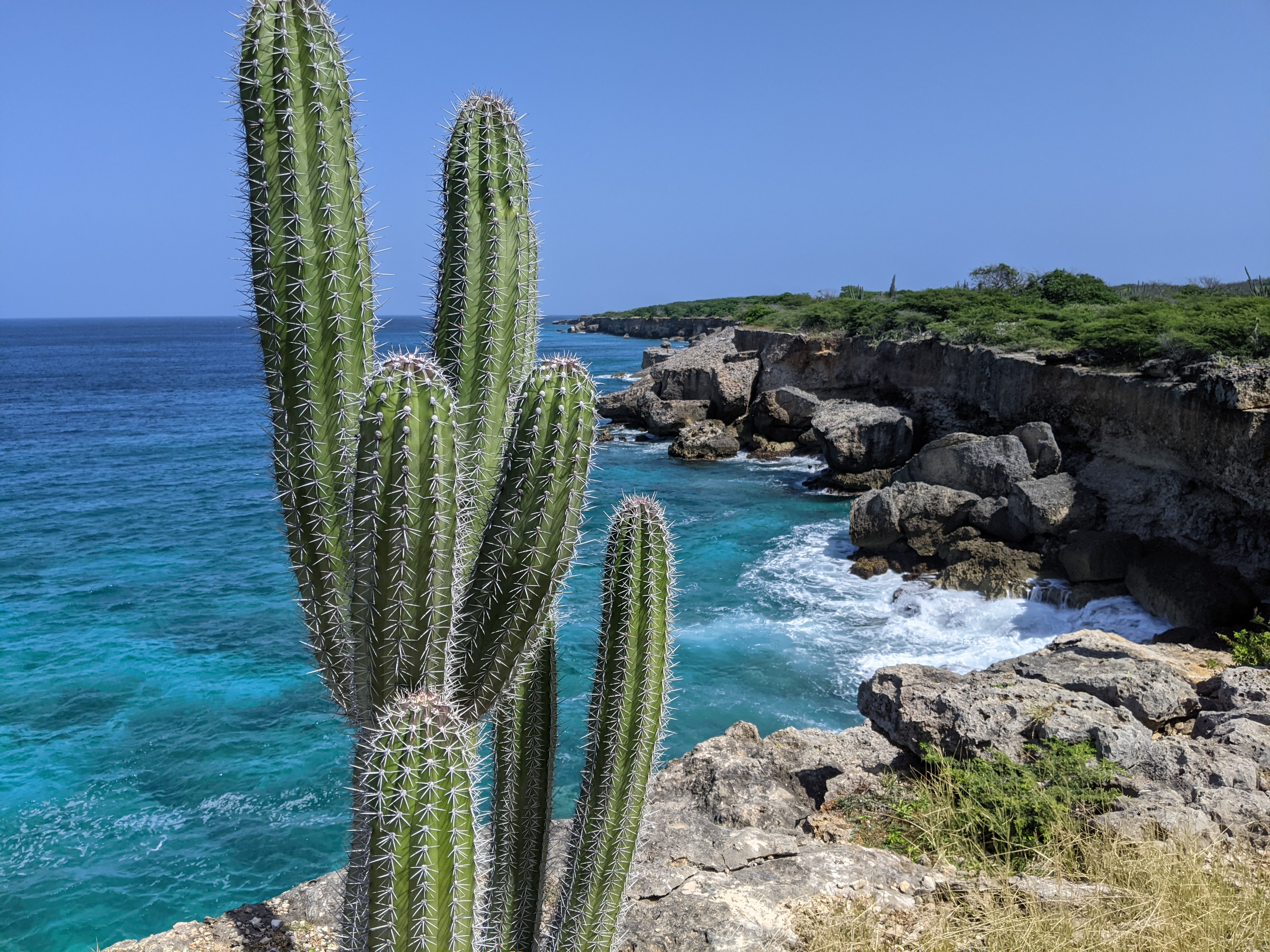
View from Cliff Villa Peninsula

Watamula is located at the westernmost point, Westpunt of the Caribbean island of Curaçao in the Netherlands Antilles

The name Watamula comes from the Dutch word Watermolen which means “water mill.” The name refers to the two currents which meet 40 ft under Cliff Villa Peninsula. Two currents stir the nutrients in the waters making it the premium diving location on the island.

On the north-most point of Watamula is a coral rock peninsula that is host to the powerful force of the waves that blow out of the porous tunnel system in the rocks like sea geysers.
