= Playa Gipy =

Beach in Curaçao

- Beach
- Location in Curaçao
- Coordinates: 12°23′25″N 69°09′21″W
- Location: Westpunt, Curaçao

Playa Gipy is a beach on the Caribbean island of Curaçao, located on the northern tip of the island, close to the village of Westpunt. The beach is small and rocky, and the waterfront is difficult to reach. There are no facilities. The beach is visited by loggerhead sea turtles.
