= Playa Forti =

Beach in Curaçao

- Beach
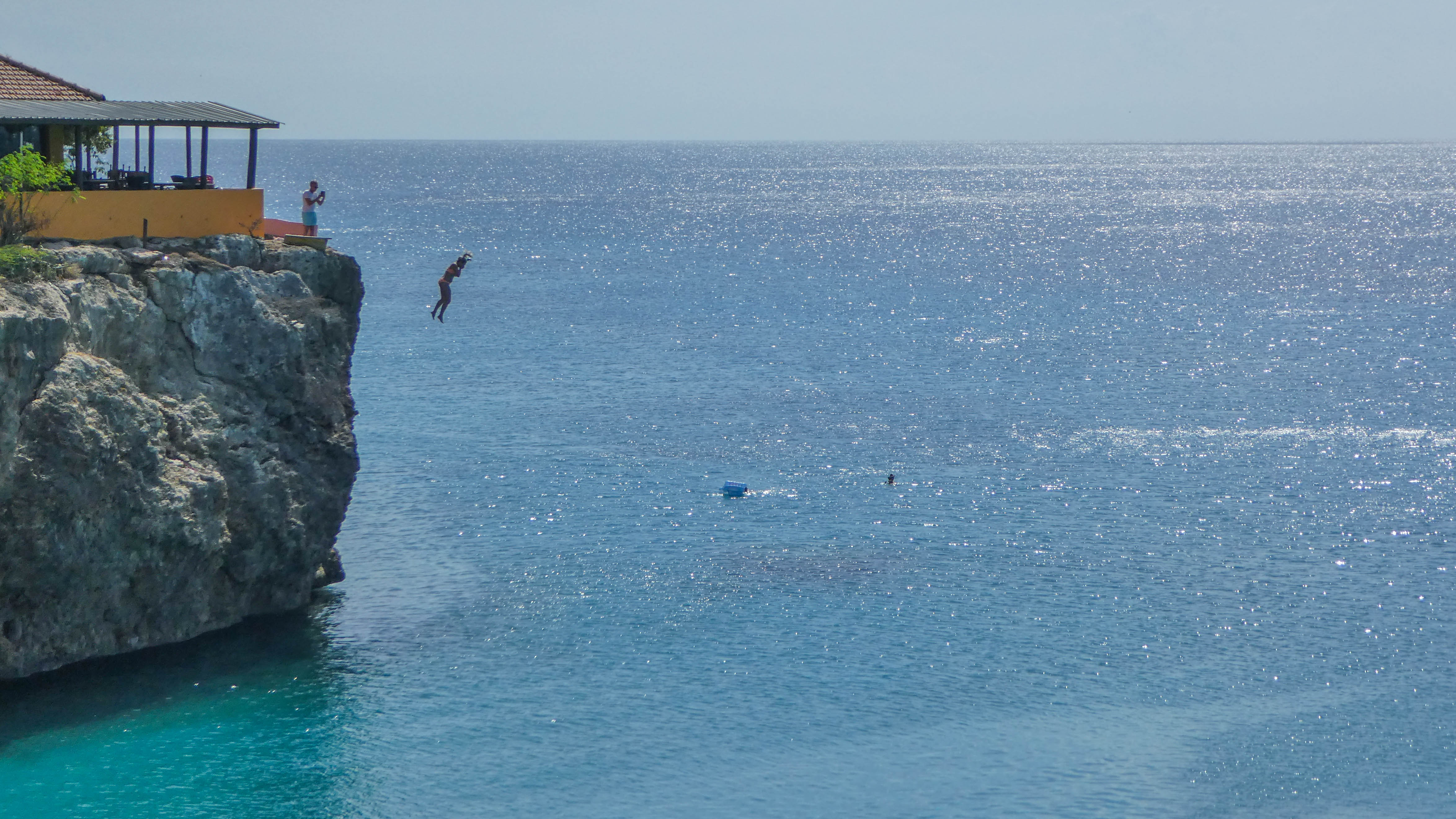
- A person jumping of the cliffs near Playa Forti

- Location within Curaçao
- Coordinates: 12°22′00″N 69°09′12″W
- Location: Westpunt, Curaçao

Playa Forti is a beach on the Caribbean island of Curaçao, located near the village of Westpunt in the north-west of the Island. It is a sandy beach with small pebbles. There are a snack bar and a restaurant. Close to the restaurant, there is a spot where one can make a 45-feet jump from a cliff into the sea. The lyrics "We're going to jump at Playa Forti" (Dutch: Bij Playa Forti gaan we springen) figure in a song of the Curaçao group: "Diverse Sauzen".
