= Kleine Knip =

Beach in Curaçao

Kleine Knip Playa Kenepa Chiki
- Beach
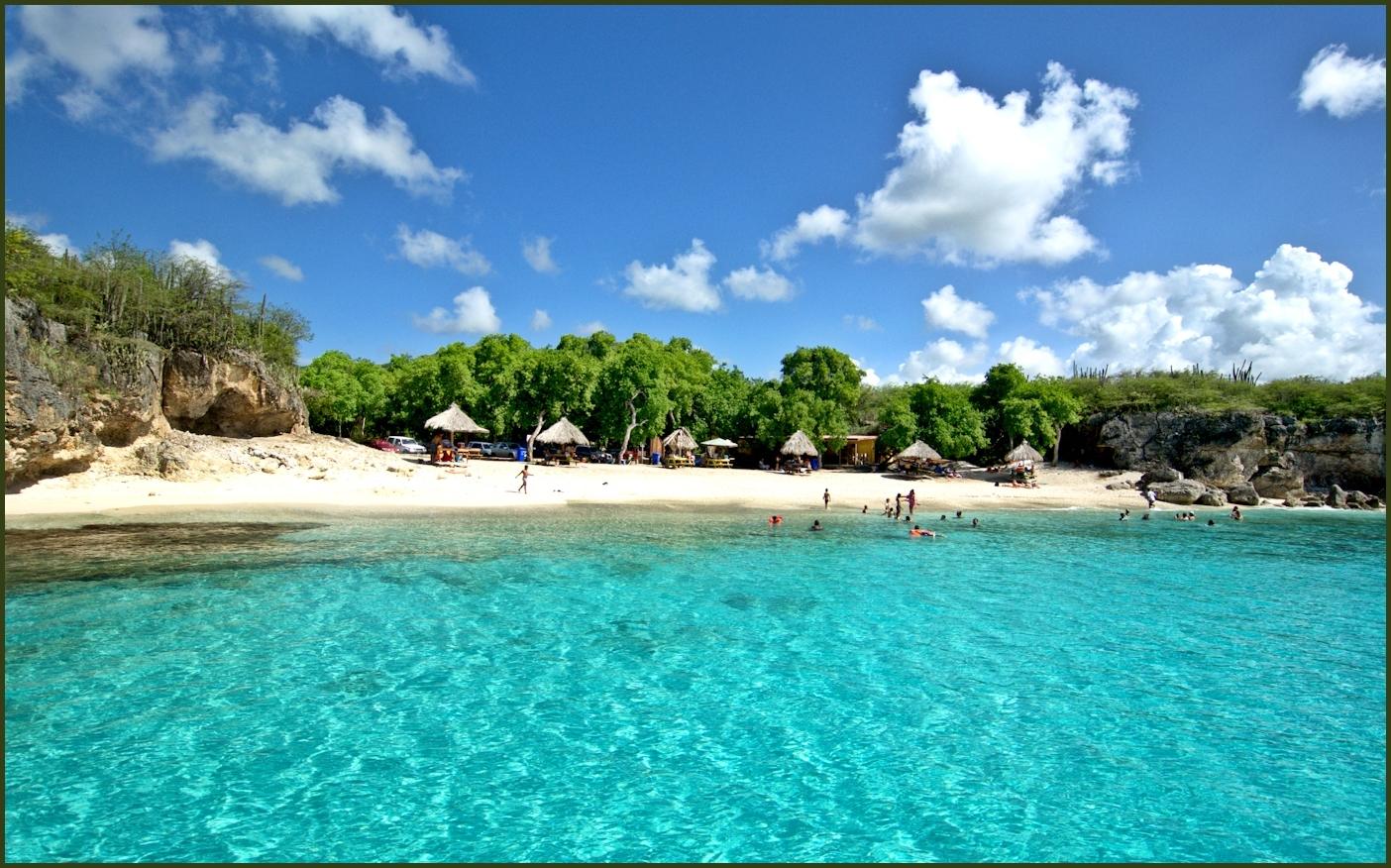
- Kenepa Chiki from a boat

- Location in Curaçao
- Coordinates: 12°20′27″N 69°09′10″W
- Location: Lagún, Curaçao

Kleine Knip (Papiamento: Playa Kenepa Chiki) is a beach on the Caribbean island of Curaçao. It is located at the western side of the island, between the villages of Westpunt and Lagún, at 50 mins drive from Willemstad. It is a small beach, located at a bay between rocks. There are only few facilities. The parking is right next to the beach.

The beach is famous for its snorkeling. The water in the bay is clear, warm and calm. The sea life is rich and interesting due to the presence of a coral reef nearby. Sea turtles and manta rays have been spotted here.

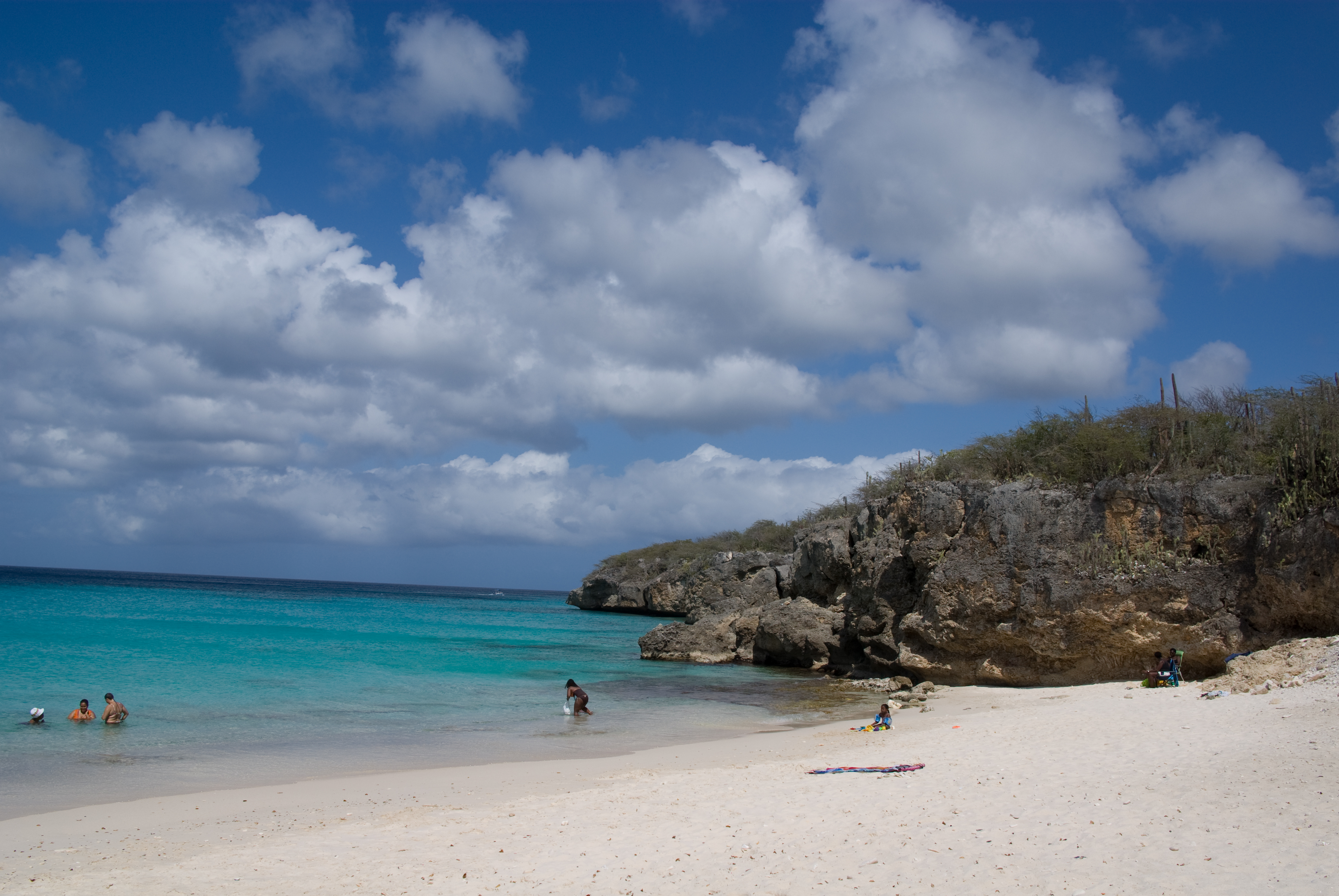
Kleine Knip, February 2010
