= Baya Beach =

Beach in Curaçao

- Beach
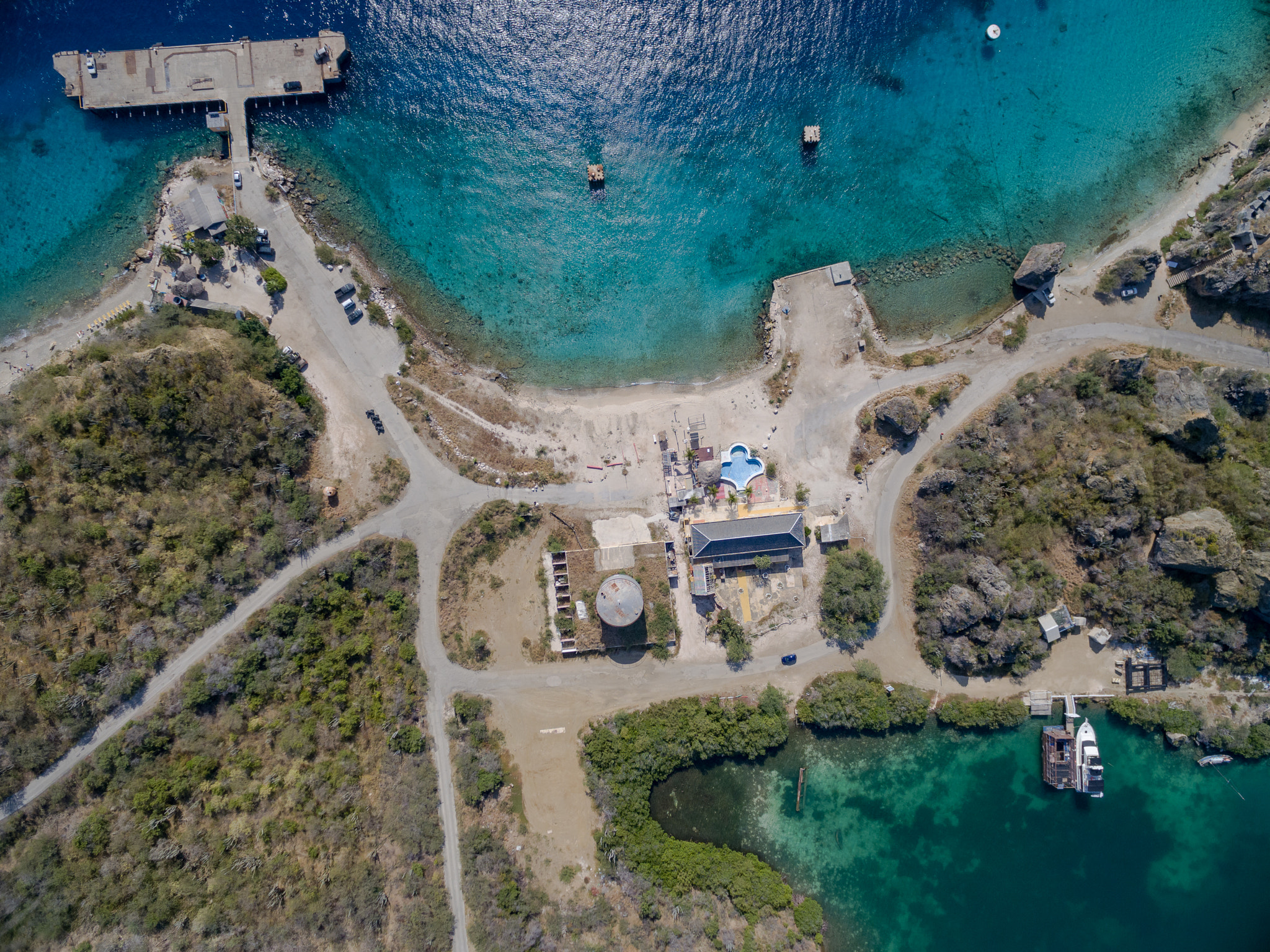
- Baya Beach from the air

- Location in Curaçao
- Coordinates: 12°04′14″N 68°51′41″W
- Location: Spaanse Water, Curaçao

Baya Beach is one of 38 official beaches on the Caribbean island of Curaçao, situated on a peninsula in the south-east of Caracas Bay next to Fort Beekenburg. It used to be a bunker port of Royal Dutch Shell; some piers and tanks can still be seen.

It is a small beach, mainly geared towards water sports. Facilities exist for renting diving material, canoes and jet skis. There are boat rides to visit the island of Klein Curaçao. Baya Beach is also known for its night life.
