= Grote Knip =

Beach in Curaçao

Grote Knip Playa Abou
- Beach
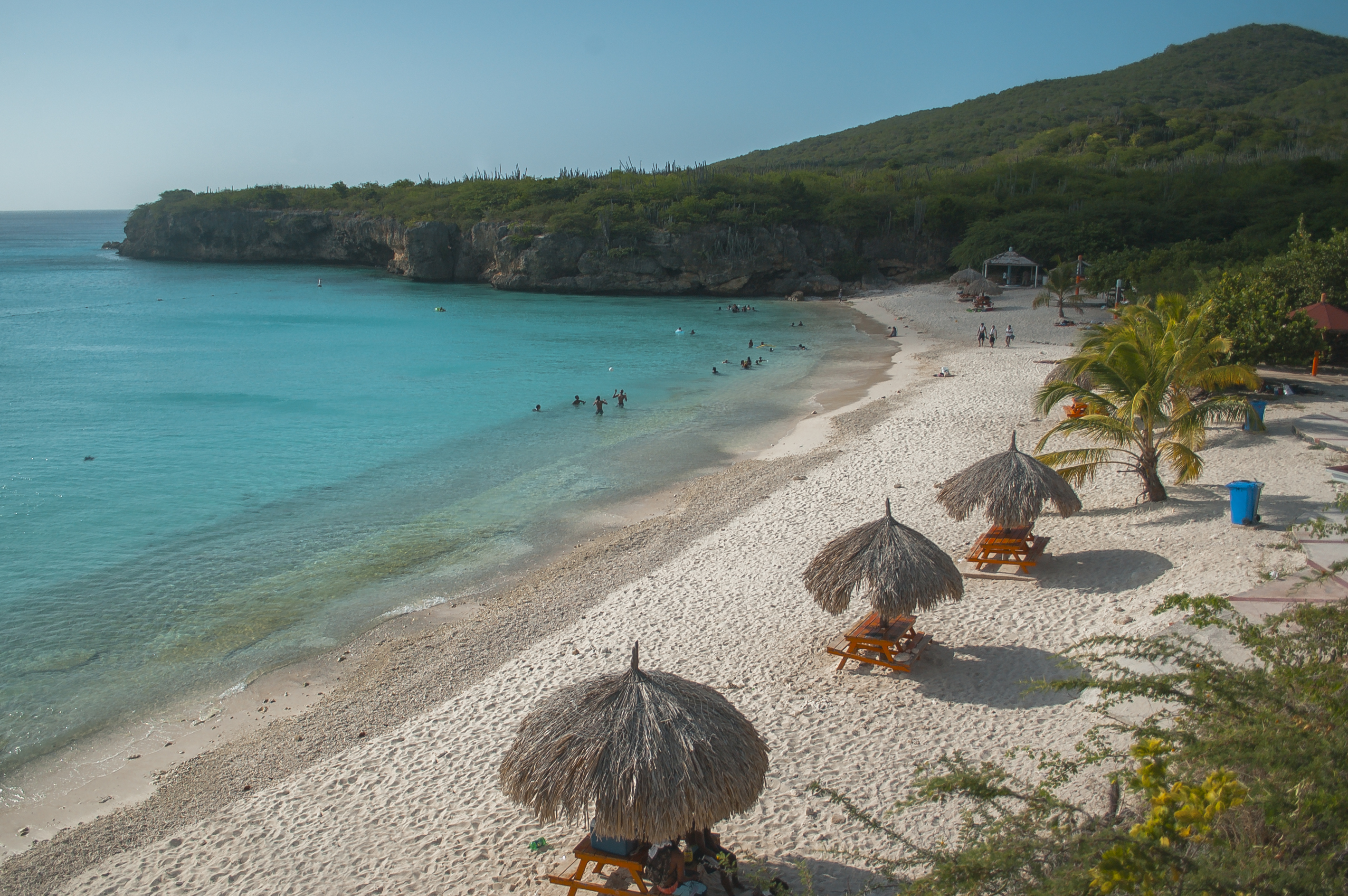
- Grote Knip

- Location in Curaçao
- Coordinates: 12°21′06″N 69°09′06″W
- Location: Westpunt, Curaçao

Grote Knip (also called Playa Abou in Papiamento, translation: "Beach in a valley") is a beach on the Caribbean island of Curaçao, located at the western side of the island, between the villages of Westpunt and Lagun. The beach gives way to a small lagune between high rocks. It is freely accessible to the public. The beach is used as a starting point for snorkeling, due to the presence of a coral reef nearby.

== Gallery ==
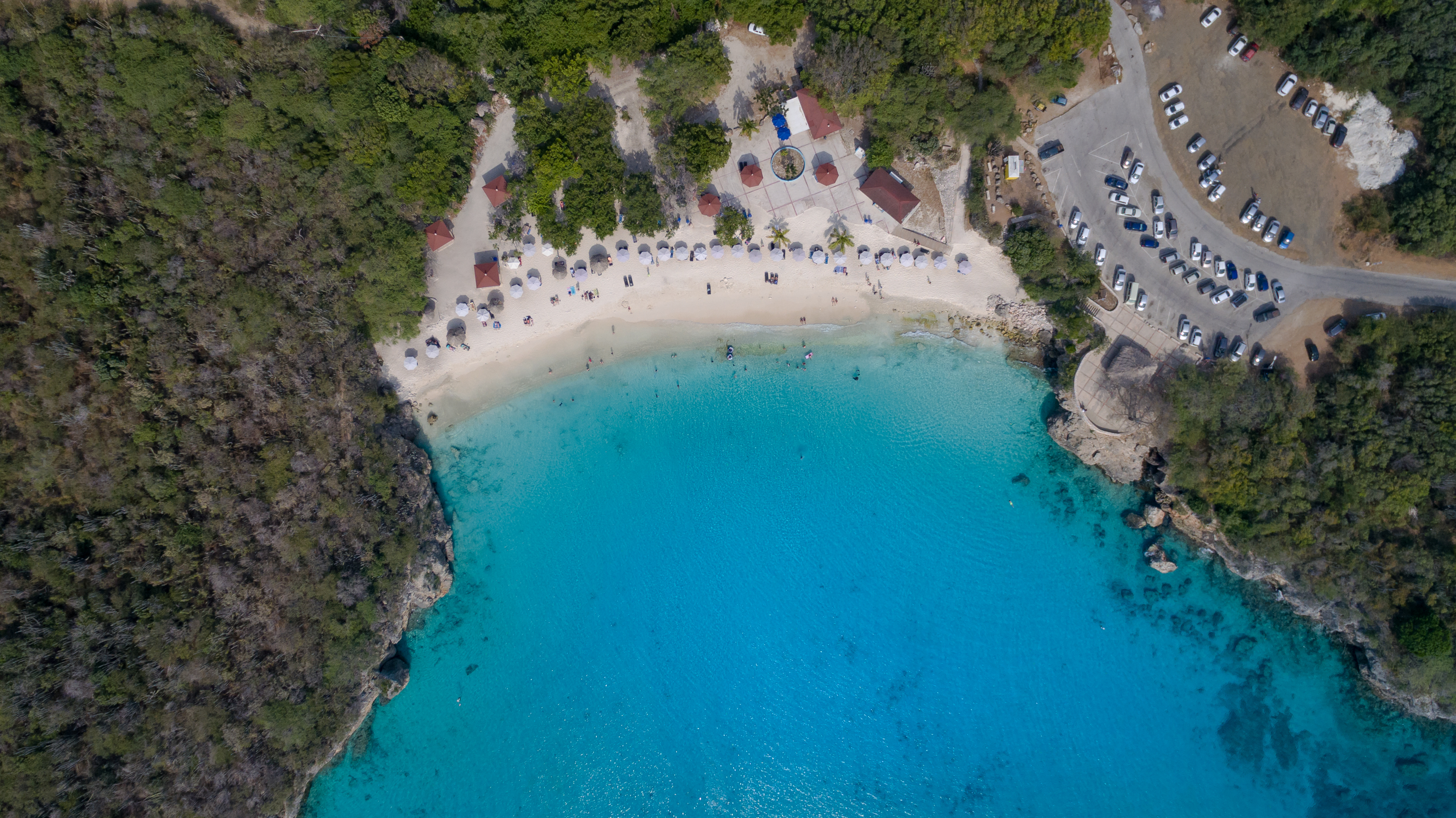
Grote Knip, Kenepa Grandi beach

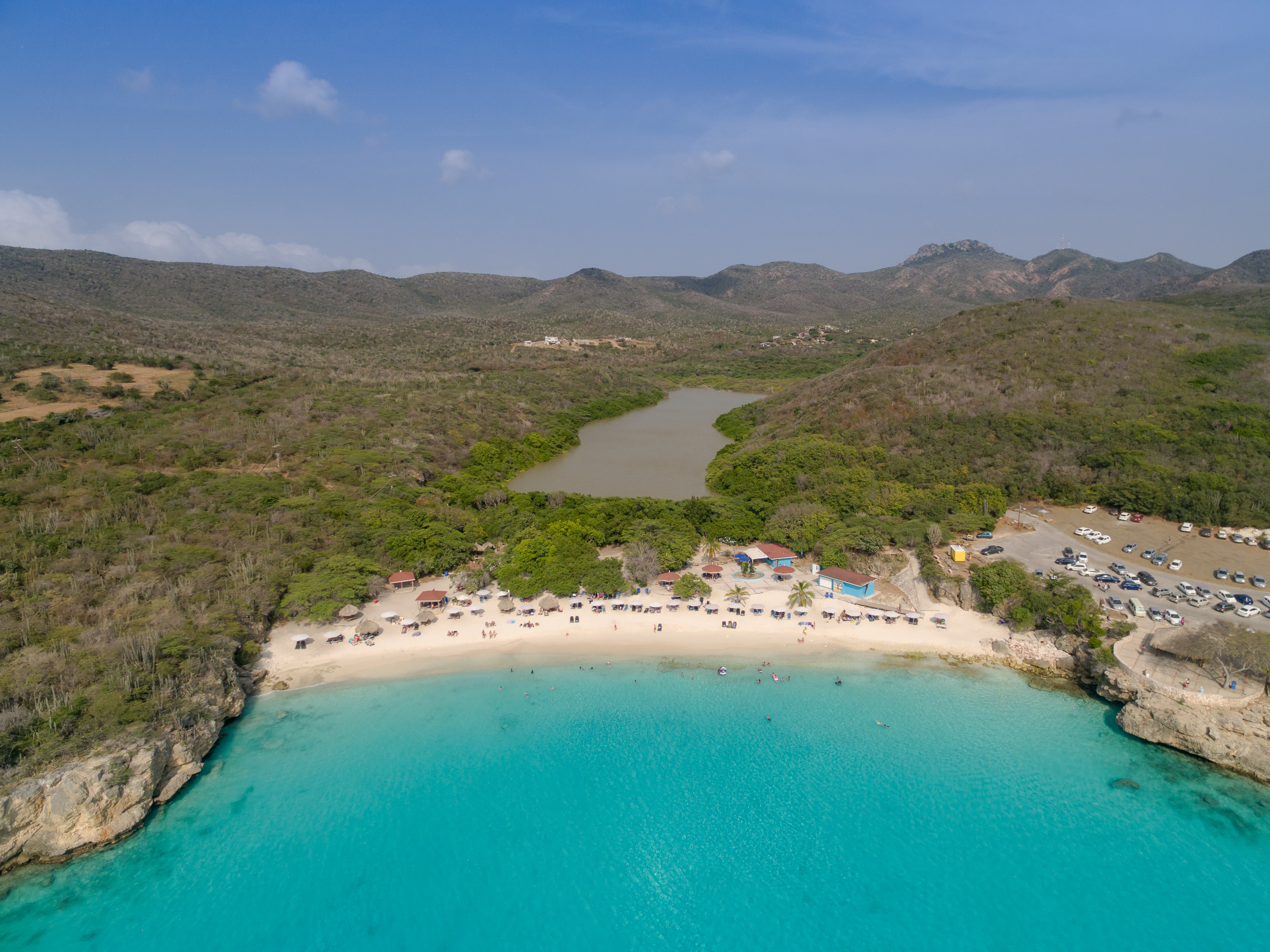
Grote Knip Curaçao

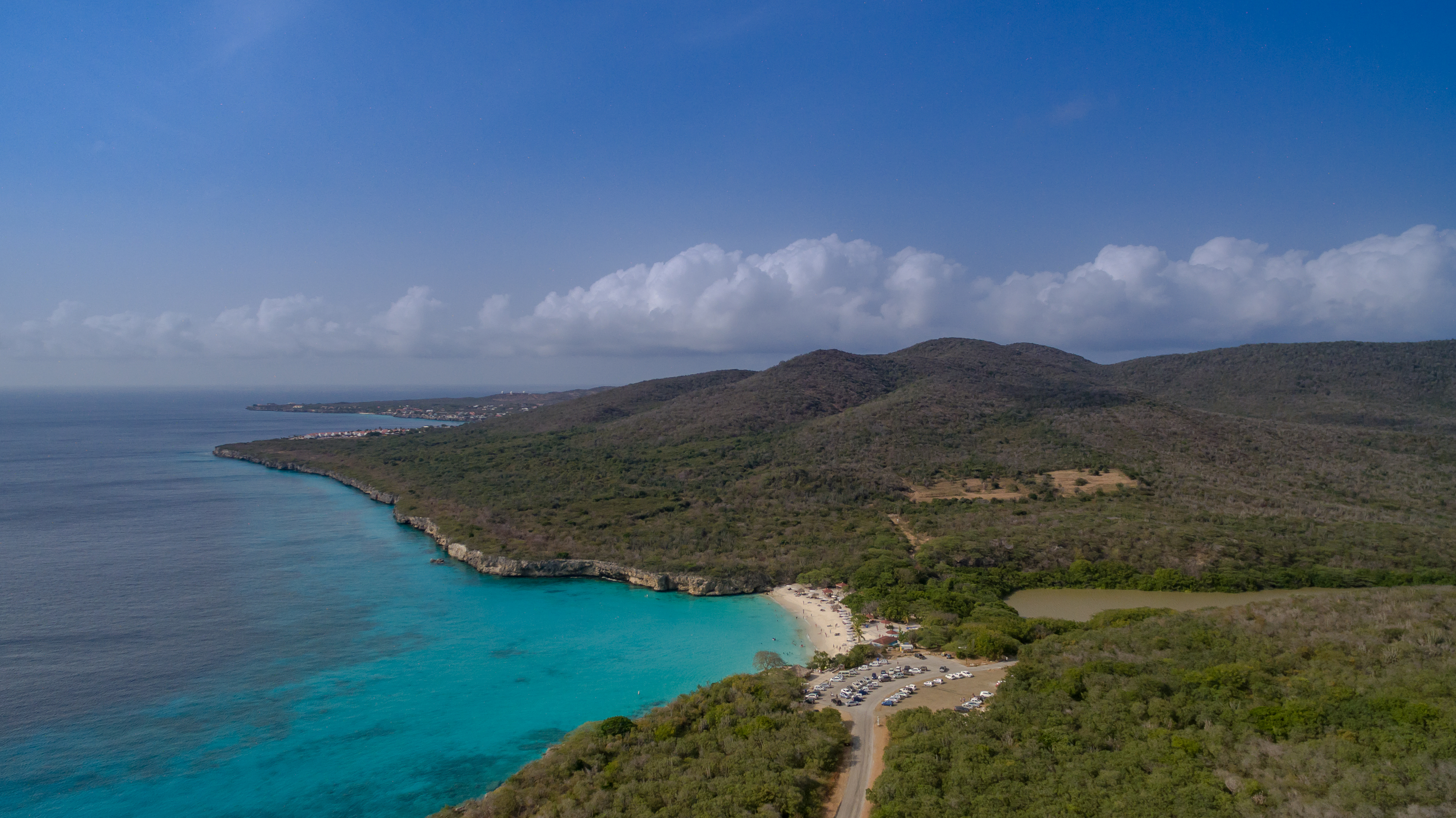
Aerial Grote Knip Curaçao
