= Westpunt =

- A pelican on Westpunt Beach

- Location in Curaçao
- Coordinates: 12°22′N 069°10′W
- State: Kingdom of the Netherlands
- Country: Curaçao
- District: Bandabou

Area
  - Total: 13.72 km^{2} (5.30 sq mi)

Population (2011)
  - Total: 738
  - Density: 53.8/km^{2} (139/sq mi)
- Climate: BSh

Westpunt is a region indicating the westernmost point of the island of Curaçao, a country within the Kingdom of the Netherlands in the Caribbean. It is located within the district of Bandabou. A flag marks the most westerly point of the island off Cliff Villa Peninsula one kilometre north of the town of Sabana Westpunt.

== History ==
Westpunt first appeared on maps of the Dutch West Indies Company around 1700. In 1849, land was donated to the Catholic Church by plantation Savonet to build a church and school. The church was finished in 1853.

A village appeared around the church in the 1860s, named today as Sabana Westpunt, inhabited by newly freed slaves following the abolition of slavery in the Kingdom of the Netherlands. Near the town is Estate Kenepa, named after the fruits of the Kenepatree. It was once one of the most prosperous plantations on the island. It produced divi-divi seed-pots and sheepwool. The colonial home is an important monument in the history of Curaçao. It was here that on 17 August 1795 a number of slaves, led by Tula, lead the Curaçao Slave Revolt of 1795.

Sabana Westpunt remained isolated for most of its history due to the 35 kilometres (22 mi) distance to Willemstad. The population density is low, and the number of inhabitants has been steadily decreasing. The per-capita income of Sabana Westpunt is significantly below average. The village is dependent on neighbouring Barber for supplies. In 2002, the elementary school closed. Tourist resorts and holiday homes have appeared near the coast.

== Overview ==
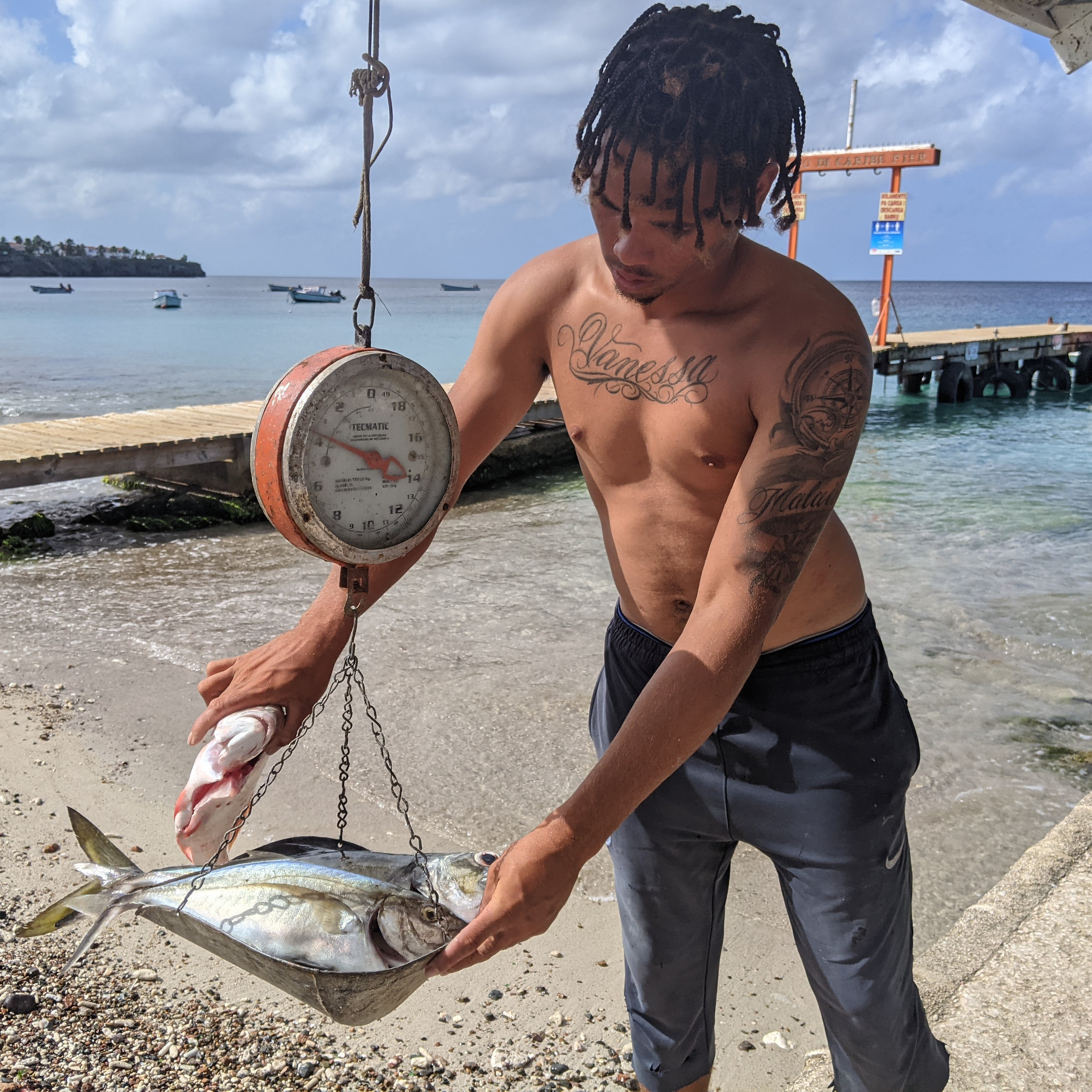
Fisherman in Westpunt

Westpunt is home to some of the island's most beautiful coral sand beaches including Playa Kalki, Playa Forti, Playa Gipy, Grote Knip and Kleine Knip. North of Playa Forti is Playa Grandi which is the sales centre for the local fishing community. The daily catch includes Barracuda, Mahi Mahi, Blacktail Tuna, Yellowtail Tuna, Red Snapper, Queen Snapper, Wahoo, Sailfish, Amberjack, Bluejack, Black Grouper, Lobster, Octopus, and Lion Fish.

The area is known for world class scuba diving, and is home to several shore and boat dive sites including a submerged air plane wreck and beautiful reefs. Most of tourist accommodation in Westpunt caters to scuba divers and offers excellent infrastructure. A dive center in Playa Kalki is available.

Westpunt is famous for the two currents that meet in-front of Cliff Villa Peninsula stirring up the nutrients in the water making it the premium diving location on the island. The dive area is called Watamula which is a corruption of the Dutch word for “water mill”.

In the northernmost point of Westpunt two kilometres in the north-eastern side of Watamula are the famous large seawater blowholes carved by the tide into the coral rock.

== Bibliography ==
- Buurtprofiel Westpunt (2011). "Buurtprofiel Westpunt" (PDF). Government of Curaçao (in Dutch).
