= Playa Kalki =

Beach in Curaçao

Playa Kalki Alice in Wonderland
- Beach
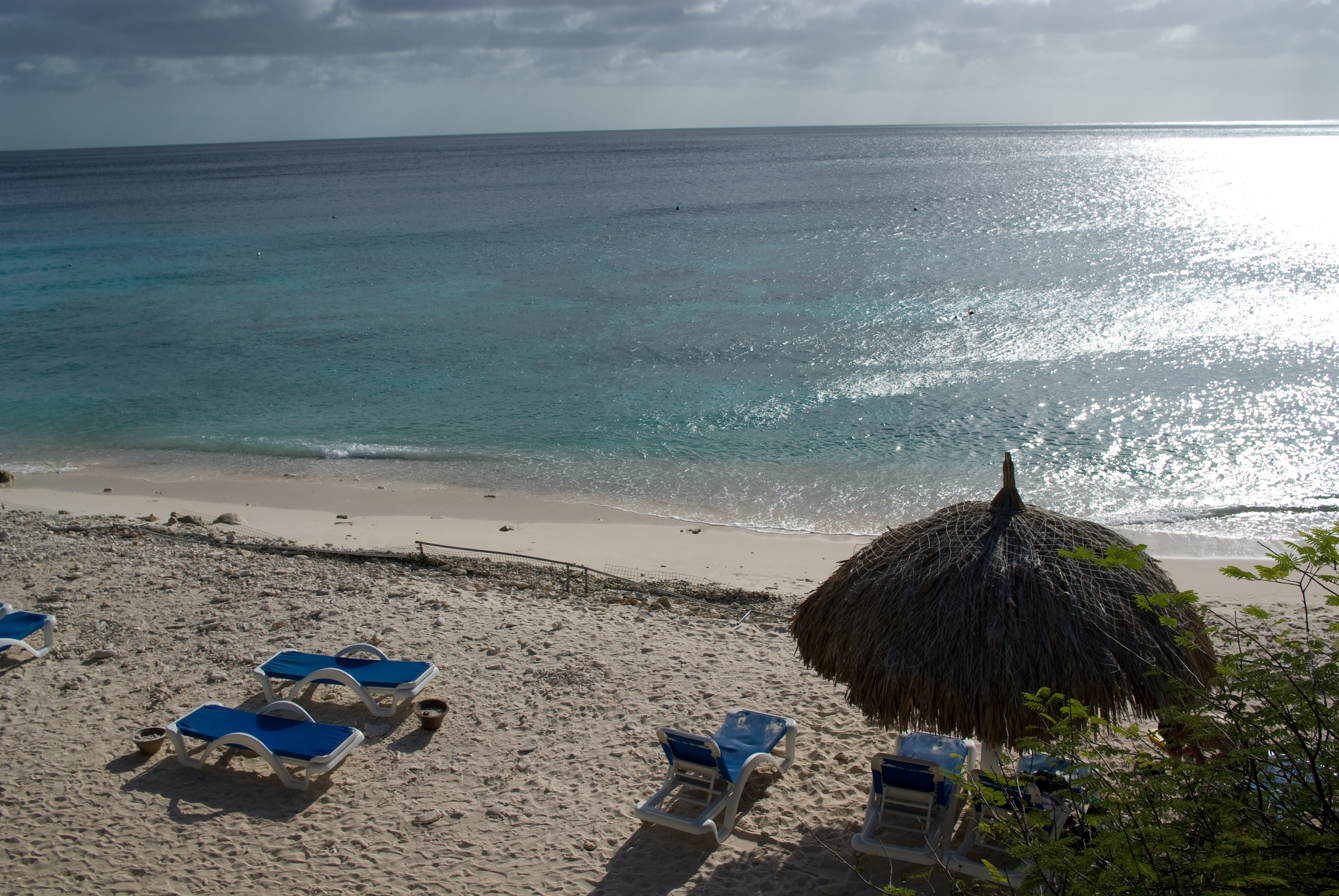

- Location in Curaçao
- Coordinates: 12°22′32″N 69°09′28″W
- Location: Westpunt, Curaçao

Playa Kalki is a beach on the Caribbean island of Curaçao, also known as Alice in Wonderland due to mushroom-shaped coral formations. The name Kalki is unrelated to the Avatar Kalki, but comes from the local Papiamentu word for the white coral rock and limestone, which is abundant on the beach and surrounding cliffs.

Playa Kalki and its surroundings are known for their good scuba diving conditions. A 3D map of the reef at Playa Kalki was published in the Reef Smart Guides dive and snorkel guide to Curaçao in 2023, detailing the over all layout of the site, as well as the location of sculptures placed on the reef. Several reefs on and around Playa Kalki offer good dive sites for beginners and professionals. There is a professional dive center located directly on the beach at Playa Kalki.
