= Geography of Martinique =

Martinique
Nickname: Island of Flowers
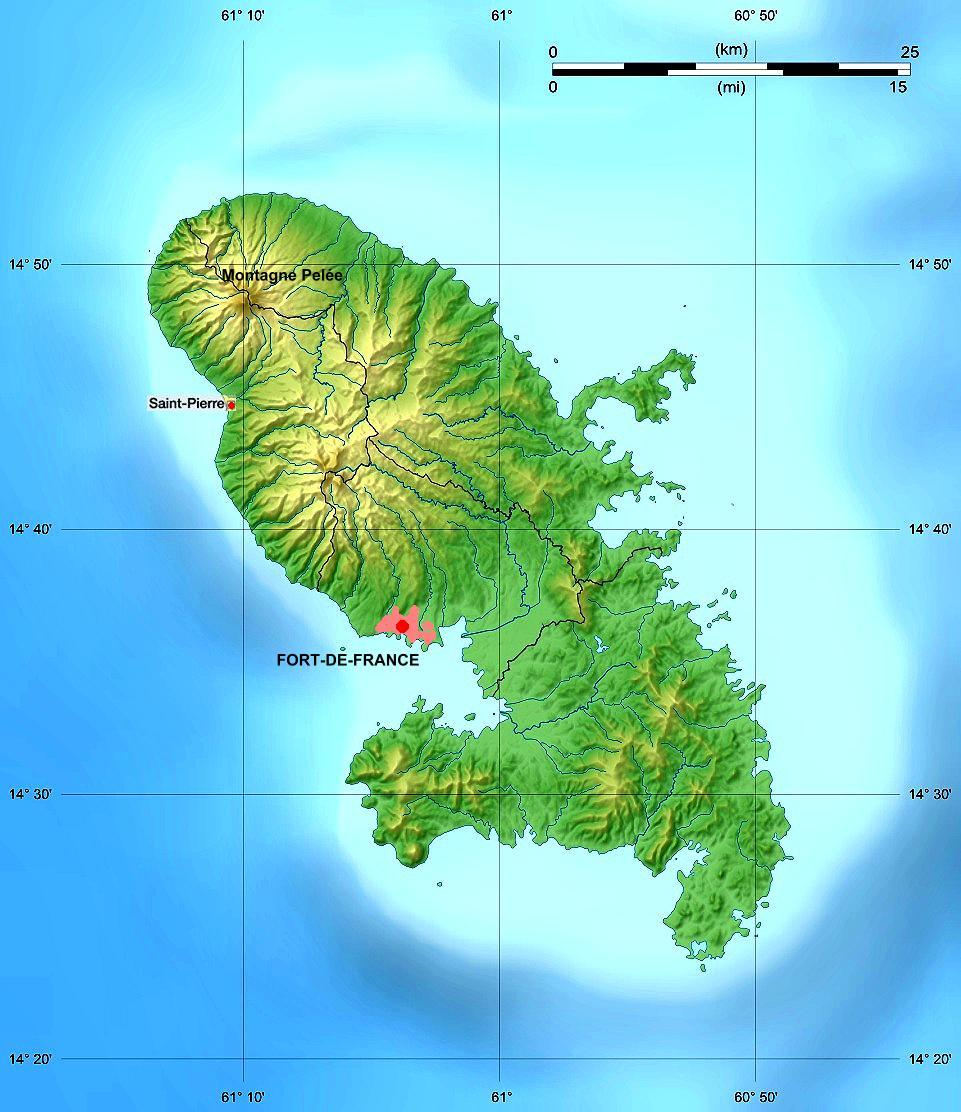
- Map of Martinique

Geography
- Location: Caribbean Sea
- Coordinates: 14°40′N 61°00′W
- Archipelago: Windward Islands
- Area: 1,060 km^{2} (410 sq mi)
- Coastline: 350 km (217 mi)
- Highest elevation: 1,397 m (4583 ft)
- Highest point: Montagne Pelée

Administration
- France
- Overseas department: Martinique
- Largest settlement: Fort-de-France (pop. 81,006)

Demographics
- Population: 372,594 (2020)
- Pop. density: 405.2/km^{2} (1049.5/sq mi)
- Ethnic groups: African and African-white-Indian mixture 90%, white 5%, Indian Tamil or East Indian, Chinese less than 5%

The French Overseas Department of Martinique is an island belonging to the Lesser Antilles group in the Caribbean Sea, southeast of Cuba and north of Trinidad and Tobago. It is part of the French West Indies. It lies near the Tropic of Cancer between 14° 26' and 14° 53' latitude north and 63° 9' and 63° 34' longitude west. At most some 50 miles long and 22 miles wide, Martinique covers an area of 425 square miles. Its coastline is so indented that no part of the island is more than seven miles from the sea.

The Island of Flowers, as Martinique is called, is a volcanic island with rather low mountains which form steep cliffs along the coasts. It can be divided into three natural zones: a mountainous region in the north, with its two highest points at Mount Pelée (an active volcano, 4,428 ft) and the Pitons du Carbet (3,960 ft); the Lamentin Plain in the center; and a hilly region in the south, composed of eroded remnants of old volcanoes and dominated by the Montagne du Vauclin (1,656 ft) and the Morne du Diamant (1,567 ft).

== Statistics ==
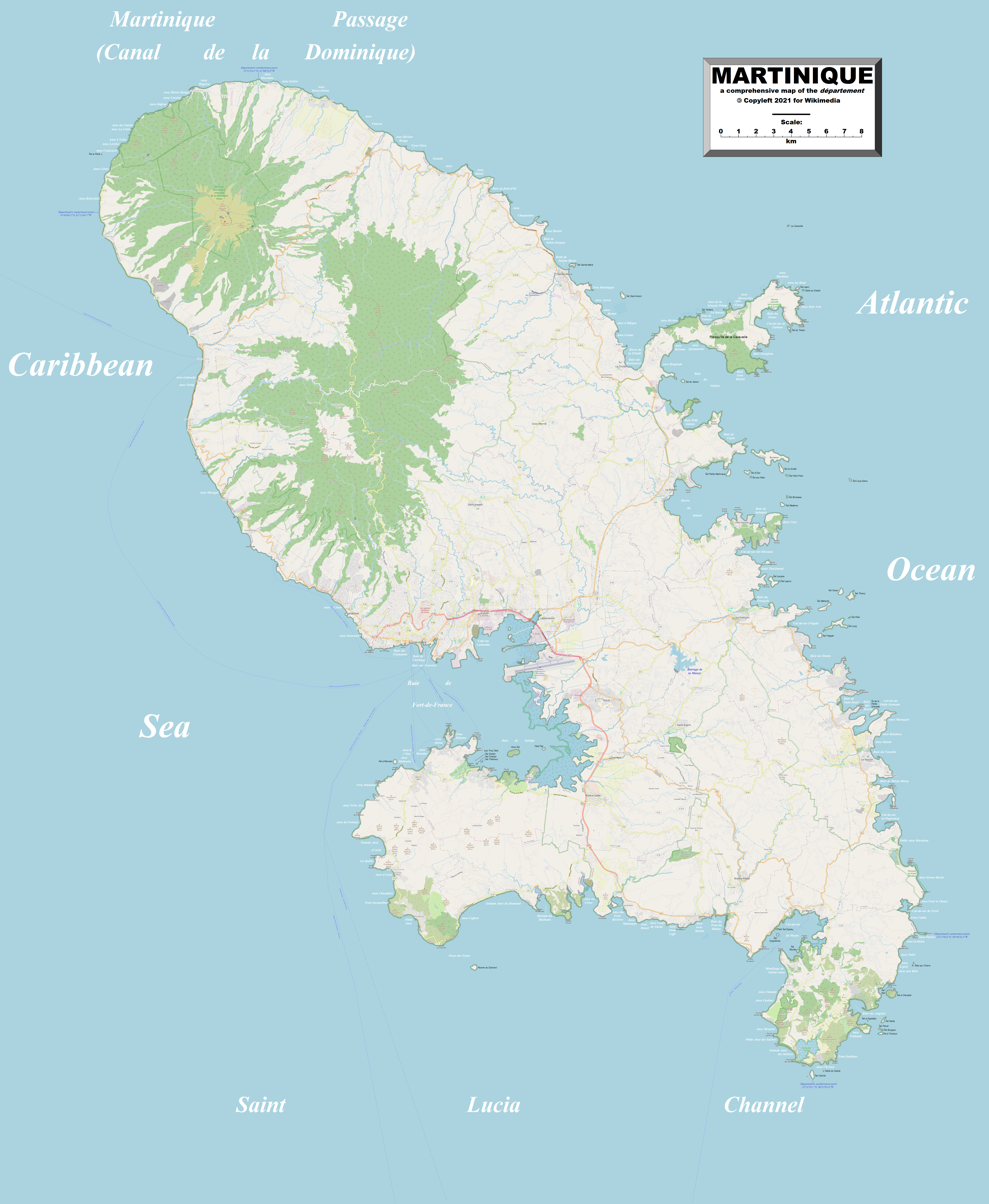
An enlargeable, detailed map of Martinique

Martinique's total area is 1,100 km², 1,060 km² of which is land, and 40 km² of which is water.

The island is slightly more than twice the size of the Isle of Man, or six times the size of the city of Washington, D.C.

Land boundaries: 0 km

Maritime claims: exclusive economic zone: 200 nmi (370.4 km; 230.2 mi), territorial sea: 12 nmi (22.2 km; 13.8 mi)

Natural resources: coastal scenery and beaches, arable land

Land use:
arable land: 8%
permanent crops: 8%
permanent pastures: 17%
forests and woodland: 44%
other: 23% (1993 est.)

Irrigated land: 40 km² (1993 estimate)

Natural hazards include hurricanes, flooding, and volcanic activity (an average of one major natural disaster every five years).

== Extreme points ==
- Northernmost point – headland at Macouba Beach
- Easternmost point – Cap Ferré
- Southernmost point – Îlet Cabrits
- Westernmost point – unnamed headland near Anse Belleville
- Highest point – Mont Pelée 1,397 m
- Lowest point – Caribbean Sea 0 m

== Terrain ==
The mountainous, sparsely populated north, covered with dense rainsforests, contains 4 main active or extinct volcanic ranges towering around 1000 metres above sea level — Pitons du Carbet, Morne Jacob, Mount Pelée and Piton Conil. Black sand beaches predominate in northern Martinique due to volcanism.

The more populated, field-covered southern part of Martinique is occupied by lower ridges and hills, towering around 400–500 metres above sea level, with a rugged coastline including numerous white sand corallian coves. The deeply populated central part of the island, home of the vast majority of the population, and formed by the lower slopes of the Pitons du Carbet massif and the Lamentin and Rivière Salée plains, covered with sugarcane and mangroves, is a transition zone between the mountainous north and the hilly south.

Martinique is surrounded by small islets and hosts three main peninsulas, the Presqu'île de la Caravelle Peninsula in the Atlantic coast, the Trois Îlets Peninsula in the Southwest Caribbean coast and the Saint Anne Peninsula in the Saint Lucia Channel.

Martinique has many rivers, but owing to its size and topography, no large ones. The most important of them —the Lorrain, Galion, Capote and Lézarde—flow through the center of the island. The rivers in the south—the Salée and Pilote—are short and often dry, while in the north they are just torrents cut by numerous waterfalls.

== Climate ==
Martinique's tropical climate is tempered by the trade winds, and the temperature averages 26 °C (79 °F) the year round. Rainfall is abundant, although unevenly distributed throughout the year, and varies according to the altitude; the annual rainfall ranges from 3988 to 4877 mm (157–192 in.) in the mountainous northern region facing the Atlantic to less than 990 mm (39 in.) in the south. Owing to this climate and the fertility of the volcanic soils, the vegetation in Martinique is luxuriant, with mangroves along the coasts and tree ferns and numerous varieties of trees in the interior.

Climate data for Fort-de-France (1981–2010 averages, extremes 1932–present)
Month	Jan	Feb	Mar	Apr	May	Jun	Jul	Aug	Sep	Oct	Nov	Dec	Year
Record high °C (°F)	31.5 (88.7)	32.1 (89.8)	33.6 (92.5)	33.0 (91.4)	33.9 (93.0)	33.6 (92.5)	33.6 (92.5)	33.0 (91.4)	33.8 (92.8)	33.0 (91.4)	32.1 (89.8)	31.3 (88.3)	33.9 (93.0)
Mean daily maximum °C (°F)	27.5 (81.5)	27.8 (82.0)	28.5 (83.3)	29.4 (84.9)	29.8 (85.6)	29.5 (85.1)	29.5 (85.1)	30.0 (86.0)	30.3 (86.5)	30.0 (86.0)	29.0 (84.2)	28.1 (82.6)	29.1 (84.4)
Daily mean °C (°F)	24.7 (76.5)	24.7 (76.5)	25.2 (77.4)	26.1 (79.0)	26.7 (80.1)	26.8 (80.2)	26.7 (80.1)	27.0 (80.6)	27.2 (81.0)	26.9 (80.4)	26.2 (79.2)	25.3 (77.5)	26.1 (79.0)
Mean daily minimum °C (°F)	21.9 (71.4)	21.7 (71.1)	22.0 (71.6)	22.8 (73.0)	23.6 (74.5)	24.0 (75.2)	23.9 (75.0)	24.0 (75.2)	24.0 (75.2)	23.8 (74.8)	23.4 (74.1)	22.6 (72.7)	23.1 (73.6)
Record low °C (°F)	17.8 (64.0)	17.3 (63.1)	18.6 (65.5)	18.9 (66.0)	19.9 (67.8)	20.0 (68.0)	18.4 (65.1)	19.5 (67.1)	17.9 (64.2)	20.2 (68.4)	19.7 (67.5)	17.4 (63.3)	17.3 (63.1)
Average rainfall mm (inches)	119.5 (4.70)	77.8 (3.06)	74.3 (2.93)	94.0 (3.70)	131.5 (5.18)	159.8 (6.29)	219.3 (8.63)	254.7 (10.03)	234.5 (9.23)	265.9 (10.47)	254.5 (10.02)	134.7 (5.30)	2,020.5 (79.55)
Average rainy days (≥ 1.0 mm)	18.93	13.60	12.77	11.50	12.70	16.43	20.00	19.57	17.90	18.17	19.00	17.60	198.17
Mean monthly sunshine hours	203.6	198.5	223.8	211.3	208.1	191.0	200.7	224.5	206.1	182.9	184.4	201.8	2,436.8
Source: Météo France

== See also ==
- Martinique
- French West Indies
