= Playa Jeremi =

Beach in Curaçao

- Beach
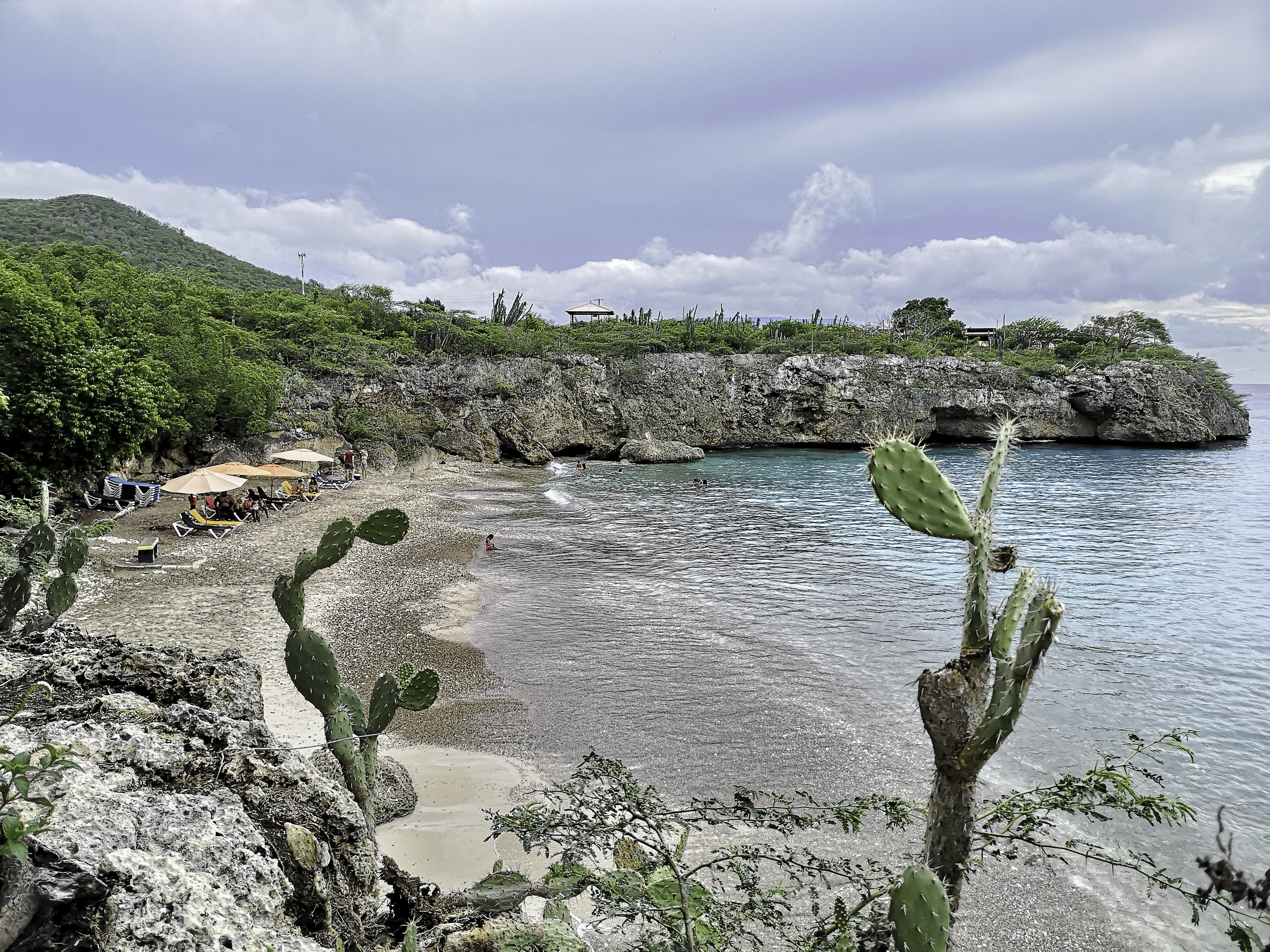

- Location in Curaçao
- Coordinates: 12°19′44″N 69°09′01″W
- Location: Lagún, Curaçao

Playa Jeremi is a beach on the Caribbean island of Curaçao, located close to the village of Lagun in the north-west of the island. The beach is made up partly of sand, partly of volcanic material. There are no facilities.
