= Playa Kanoa =

Beach in Curaçao

- Beach
- Location in Curaçao
- Coordinates: 12°10′20″N 68°51′47″W
- Location: Willemstad, Curaçao

Playa Kanoa is a beach on the Caribbean island of Curaçao, located to the north of Willemstad. It is one of the few beaches on the northern side of the island. Surfing is a popular activity on the beach. There is a snack bar as well as a fish restaurant, and there is a nearby fisherman's village.
