= Kanon =

Kanon may refer to:

== Media and literature ==
- Kanon (video game), a Japanese visual novel by Key, later adapted into anime series
- Kanon (manga), a manga by Chiho Saito
- Daimajin Kanon, a Japanese tokusatsu television drama
- Der Kanon, an anthology of important German literature
- The Kanon Award, one of the movie awards of Norwegian film festival Kosmorama
- Kanón, an anime short film, part of the Japan Animator Expo series

== People ==
- Kanon (bassist) (21st century), Japanese bassist and member of An Cafe
- Kanon (singer) (born 1980), Japanese singer
- Kanon Catchings, American basketball player
- Kanon Fukuda (born 1995), Japanese singer and voice actress
- Kanon Kasuga (born 2003), Japanese actress
- Kanon Kimoto (born 1997), a former member of the Japanese idol girl group SKE48
- Kanon Mori (born 1996), Japanese field hockey
- Kanon Miyahara (born 1996), Japanese actress and karate performer
- Kanon Shizaki, Japanese voice actress
- Kanon Suzuki (born 1998), Japanese singer and member of Morning Musume
- Kanon Takao (born 2002), Japanese voice actress
- Kanon Tani (born 2004), Japanese child actress
- Kanon Wakeshima (born 1988), Japanese singer and cellist
- Joseph Kanon (born 1946), American novelist
- Wilfried Kanon (born 1993), Ivorian professional footballer
- Kanon (born 2002), a member of the Japanese idol group Atarashii Gakko!

=== Fictional characters ===
- Kanon, a character from visual novel and anime series Umineko When They Cry
- Kanon, a character in the video game Wild Arms 2
- Gemini Kanon, a character from the manga and anime series Saint Seiya
- Kanon Ichinose, a character from the tokusatsu series Idol x Warrior Miracle Tunes
- Kanon Maldini, a character from the anime series Code Geass: Lelouch of the Rebellion
- Kanon Nakagawa, a character from the manga and anime series The World God Only Knows
- Kanon Shibuya, the protagonist from the anime series Love Live! Superstar!!
- Kanon Endou, a character from the anime movie Inazuma Eleven: Saikyō Gundan Ōga Shūrai
- Kanon Nakajima, a character in the video game Danganronpa Another Episode: Ultra Despair Girls
- Kanon Matsubara, a character from BanG Dream!

== Music ==
- Kanon, German spelling of canon in music
- Kanon, Op. 59 No. 4, composition by Max Reger
- Kanon D major, Op. 63 No. 11, composition by Max Reger
- Kanon, 1930, a composition by Alban Berg
- Kanon, or canon, a structured hymn in the Orthodox Church, such as the Great Kanon of St. Andrew of Crete
- Kanon Pokajanen by Arvo Pärt
- "Kanon", a 2005 song by Enon from Lost Marbles & Exploded Evidence
- Kanōn, or monochord, a one-stringed instrument

== Places ==
- Kanon-machi Station, a tram station in Hiroshima
- Punt Kanon, a point at the extreme southeast of Curaçao

== Artillery ==
- 4cm kanón vz. 36, an anti-tank gun produced by the Škoda Works in 1930s
- 7.5 cm kanon PL vz. 37, a Czech anti-aircraft gun used in World War II
- 8 cm kanon vz. 28, a Czech field gun used in World War II
- 8 cm kanon vz. 30, a Czech field gun used in World War II
- 8.35 cm PL kanon vz. 22, a Czech anti-aircraft gun used in World War II
- 9 cm kanon PL vz. 12/20, a Czech anti-aircraft gun used in World War II
- 10.5 cm kanon m/34, a heavy field gun produced in Sweden
- Bofors 15,2 cm kanon m/42, a naval gun for use on ships

== Other uses ==
- Kanon, a Japanese name for Guanyin, a Buddhist spiritual figure
- Kan-on (漢音, literally "Han sound"): one of the sources of Japanese pronunciation

== See also ==
- Canon (disambiguation)
- Cannon (disambiguation)
- Kanoon (disambiguation)
- Qanun (disambiguation)
