= Cannon (disambiguation) =

A cannon is a large-caliber gun classified as a type of artillery.

Cannon or Cannons may also refer to:

== Places ==
=== United Kingdom ===
- Cannons (house), an 18th-century palace built for the Duke of Chandos in Stanmore
- Cannon Street, London
  - Cannon Street station

=== United States ===
- Cannon, Delaware
- Cannon, Kentucky
- Cannon City, Minnesota, an unincorporated community
- Cannon County, Tennessee
- Cannon Township, Michigan
- Cannon Township, Kittson County, Minnesota
- Cannon Lake (disambiguation)
- Lake Cannon, Florida
- Cannon Mountain (New Hampshire)
- Cannon Mountain (Washington)
- Mount Cannon, Montana
- Cannon Park (Charleston, South Carolina), a public park
- Cannon River (Minnesota)
- Cannon Island (Alaska)

=== Elsewhere ===
- Cannon River (Queensland), Australia, a tributary of the Langlo River
- Cape Cannon, Greenland
- Cannon Rock, an island in County Down, Northern Ireland
- Cannon (crater), on the Moon

== Arts and entertainment ==
=== Music ===
- Il Cannone Guarnerius (The Cannon), a violin made by Giuseppe Antonio Guarneri in 1743
- Cannon depth, tom-toms and bass drums deeper than power depth
- Cannon (band), a post rock band from Glasgow, Scotland, active between 1999 and 2003
- Cannons (band), a Los Angeles indie pop band
- Cannons (album), a 2007 album by Phil Wickham
- "Cannon" (song), from Subliminal Plastic Motives by Self
- "Cannon", a song from The White Stripes by the White Stripes
- "Cannons", a song from the debut album The Year of Hibernation by Youth Lagoon
- "Cannons", a song from Education, Education, Education & War by Kaiser Chiefs

=== Other arts and entertainment ===
- Cannon (TV series), 1971–1976, starring William Conrad as Frank Cannon
  - Cannon, the 1971 pilot TV movie for the series
- Heroes, Inc. Presents Cannon, a comic book

== Business ==
- The Cannon Group, Inc., an American group of companies, including:
  - Cannon Films, a former motion picture studio
- Cannon (ITT Corporation), a manufacturer of cables, switches and connectors
- Cannon Mills, a textile manufacturer
- CannonDesign, an architectural firm founded in 1945
- Great Wall Pao, a Chinese pickup truck also called the Cannon
- Cannon (automobile), produced from 1902 to 1906

== Military ==
- Cannon Air Force Base, New Mexico, United States
- Cannon-class destroyer escort, a World War II United States Navy class of destroyer escorts
  - USS Cannon (DE-99), lead ship of the class
- Old Jeremiah, a British naval gun, affectionately referred to as The Cannon

== People ==
- Cannon (surname)
- Cannon family, an American political family
- Cannon (given name)
- Freddy Cannon, stage name of American singer Frederick Anthony Picariello Jr. (born 1940)
- Patty Cannon, American slave trader and serial killer Lucretia Patricia Hanly (c. 1760–1829)
- Poppy Cannon, American cookbook writer and food editor Lillian Gruskin (1905–1975)
- Tommy Cannon, stage name of British comedian Thomas Derbyshire (born 1938)

== Sports ==
- Boston Cannons, a professional men's field lacrosse team
- Calder Cannons, an Australian rules football club from Melbourne, Australia
- Ohio Cannon, a professional American football team in 1999
- Cannon, a British/Canadian term for a snooker or billiards shot

== Other uses ==
- Cannon bone, a bone in the forelimb of a horse
- Cannon Field, Texas, United States, a privately owned, public use airport
- Cannon School, a private school in Concord, North Carolina, United States
- Rutgers–Princeton Cannon War, part of the rivalry between American universities Rutgers and Princeton

== See also ==
- Cannon & Fetzer, an American architectural firm from 1909 to 1937
- Great Cannon, a cyberweapon used by the Chinese government
- Cannon or XLR connector
- Cannons Creek (disambiguation)
- Canon (disambiguation)
