= Gorge (disambiguation) =

A gorge or canyon is a deep cleft resulting from weathering and the erosive activity of rivers.

Gorge may also refer to:

- Gorge (mythology), a figure from Greek mythology
- Gorge FC, an American amateur soccer team
- Gorge Trio, an American experimental rock band
- Gorge walking or canyoning
- Gorge (fishing hook)
- Gorge (fortification), the interior or rear part of a fort

== See also ==
- Canyon (disambiguation)
- Canon (disambiguation)
- The Gorge (disambiguation)
- Gorges (disambiguation)
- List of canyons
- Royal Gorge (disambiguation)
