= Sessoms =

Sessoms is a family name. Notable people with the surname include:

- Allen Sessoms (born 1946), American physicist, diplomat, and academic administrator
- Darius Nathaniel Sessoms, murderer
- Petey Sessoms (born 1972), American basketball player
- Will Sessoms (born c. 1954), American politician and bank officer
