= Kanoon (disambiguation) =

Kanoon is a 1960 Indian Hindi film.

Kanoon may also refer to:

- Institute for the Intellectual Development of Children and Young Adults, Iran, commonly known as Kanoon
- Kanoon (1943 film), a Hindi/Urdu social film
- Kanoon (1994 film), Hindi
- Kanoon (TV series), an Indian television courtroom drama/crime series (1993-96)
- Qanun (instrument) or kanoon, a Middle Eastern string instrument

== See also ==
- Cannon (disambiguation)
- Canon (disambiguation)
- Kanon (disambiguation)
- Qanun (disambiguation)
- (including several films)
