= Canyon (disambiguation) =

A canyon, cañon or gorge is a geographical feature.

Canyon may also refer to:

== Places ==
=== Canada ===
- Canyon, Algoma District, Ontario
- Canyon, Kenora District, Ontario

=== United States ===
- Canyon, Alameda County, California
- Canyon County, Idaho
- Canyon, Minnesota
- Canyon, Texas
- Canyon, Washington
- Canyon, West Virginia

== Business ==
- Canyon Bicycles, German bicycle manufacturer
- A brand owned by Cyprus-based ASBIS

== People ==
- Canyon Barry (born 1994), American basketball player
- Christy Canyon (born 1966), retired pornographic actress

== Music ==
- Canyon (indie rock band), a slowcore band from Washington, D.C.
- Canyon (country music band), an American country music group
- Canyon (Paul Winter album), 1985
- Canyon (Jimmy Ibbotson album), 2007
- The Canyon (The Used album), 2017
- The Canyon (Joe Newman album), 2025
- CANYON.MID, a sample MIDI file composed by George Stone, produced by Passport Designs and included with older versions of Microsoft Windows

== Others ==
- The Canyon (film), a 2009 American thriller directed by Richard Harrah
- The Canyons (film), a 2013 thriller neo-noir directed by Paul Schrader
- Canyon (satellite), a 1972 series of United States spy satellites
- Canyons (novel), a 1990 novel by Gary Paulsen
- Canyon (Rauschenberg), a 1959 painting by Robert Rauschenberg
- Canyon (horse), a British racehorse
- Canyon, a character first appeared in the episode "Billy's Bucket List" of the animated series Adventure Time
- GMC Canyon, a Chevrolet Colorado with GMC logos
- The Canyon (building), a 23-story waterfront residential tower in San Francisco, California

== See also ==
- Gorge (disambiguation)
- Canon (disambiguation)
- Canyon Lake (disambiguation)
- Canyon City (disambiguation)
