= Canyon Lake =

Canyon Lake, Lake Canyon, or lakes named "Cañon", may refer to:

== Bodies of water ==
- Canyon Lake (Arizona)
- Canyon Lake (California)
- Canyon Lake (South Dakota)
- Canyon Lake (Texas)
- Canyon Lake (Michigan)
- Lake Canyon (Lakeland, Florida)

== Places ==
- Canyon Lake, California
- Canyon Lake, Texas

== See also ==
- Cannon Lake (disambiguation)
- Canyon (disambiguation)
