= Cannons Creek =

Cannons Creek may refer to:

- Cannons Creek, Victoria, a coastal village in Australia
- Cannons Creek, New Zealand, a suburb of Porirua, New Zealand
- Cannons Creek Independent School, an independent school in Pinelands, Cape Town, South Africa

== See also ==
- Cannon Creek Lake, reservoir in Kentucky
- Cannon (disambiguation)
