= Cannon Park (disambiguation) =

Cannon Park may refer to:

- Cannon Park, a suburb in Coventry, West Midlands, England
- Cannon Park, Milwaukee, Wisconsin, United States, a neighborhood in Milwaukee
- Cannon Park (Charleston, South Carolina), United States, a public park
