= Canon =

Canon or Canons may refer to:

== Arts and entertainment ==
- Canon (fiction), the material accepted as officially written by an author or an ascribed author
- Western canon, the body of high culture literature, music, philosophy, and works of art that is highly valued in the West
- Canon of proportions, a formally codified set of criteria deemed mandatory for a particular artistic style of figurative art
- Canon (music), a type of composition
- Canon (hymnography), a type of hymn used in Eastern Orthodox Christianity.
- Canon (album), a 2007 album by Ani DiFranco
- Canon (film), a 1964 Canadian animated short
- Canon (manga), by Nikki
- Canonical plays of William Shakespeare
- The Canon (Natalie Angier book), a 2007 science book by Natalie Angier
- The Canon (podcast), concerning film

== Brands and enterprises ==
- Canon Inc., a Japanese imaging and optical products corporation
- Château Canon (disambiguation), a number of wineries
- UBM Canon, a media company headquartered in Los Angeles

== People ==
- Canon (rapper) (born Aaron McCain, 1989)
- Fernando Canon (1860–1938), Filipino revolutionary general, poet, inventor, engineer, musician and chess player
- Lou Canon, stage name of Leanne Greyerbiehl, a Canadian indie pop singer-songwriter

== Places ==
- Canon, Georgia, United States
- Canons Park, London, United Kingdom
  - Canons (ward), an electoral ward
- Canon Row, a street in Westminster, London
- Cañon City, Colorado, United States
- Cañon Fiord, on Ellesmere Island in Nunavut, Canada

== Religion ==
- Religious text § Authority of religious texts: some religious texts are accepted or categorized as canonical, some non-canonical, and others extracanonical, semi-canonical, deutero-canonical, pre-canonical or post-canonical
  - Biblical canon, a set of texts regarded by a Christian or Jewish community as part of the Bible
- Canon law, the whole judicial system in Christian churches
  - Canon (canon law), a law or ordinance promulgated by a synod, ecumenical council, or individual bishop (within the canon law system of that Church).
- Canon (clergy), a title of certain Christian priests
  - Canon regular, a priest who lives in community under a rule
- Canon (hymnography), a kind of hymn in Eastern Orthodox Christianity
- Roman Canon, the traditional anaphora used in the Roman Rite of the Mass.
- Pāli Canon, scriptures of Theravāda Buddhism (these include the Sutta Pitaka, the Vinaya Pitaka and the Abhidhamma Pitaka)

== Other uses ==
- Canon (basic principle), an accepted body of rules
- Canon, in bellfounding, one or more hanging loops cast integrally with the crown
- The Canon of Medicine, a 1025 CE medical encyclopedia by Ibn Sīnā (Avicenna)
- Canon Yaoundé, a Cameroonian association football club based in the capital city of Yaoundé
- Canons High School, Edgware, Greater London

== See also ==
- Canaan, a region in the Ancient Near East
- Cannon (disambiguation)
- Canonical, standard or referential form; includes many examples of canons
- Canonization, the act of a pope's declaring a deceased person a saint
- Canyon (disambiguation)
- Kanon (disambiguation)
- Kanoon (disambiguation)
- Qanun (disambiguation)
