= Cannon (given name) =

Cannon is a masculine given name which may refer to:

- Cannon Clough (born 1995), American soccer player
- Cannon Hinnant (2015–2020), American five-year-old murder victim
- Cannon Kingsley (born 2001), American tennis player
