= Klein Curaçao =

Uninhabited island in the Dutch Caribbean

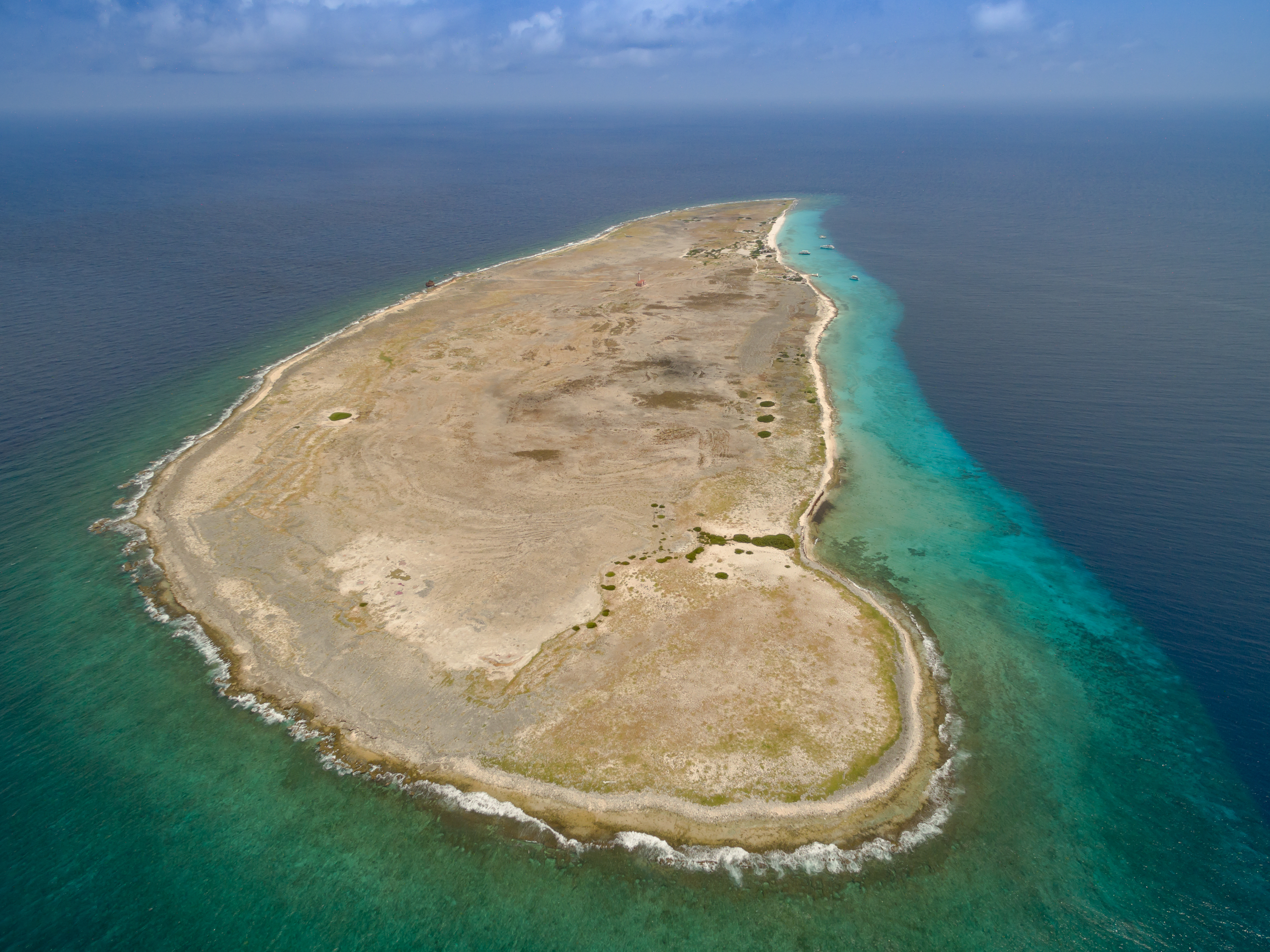
- Aerial view of Klein Curaçao

- Location within Curaçao Location within the Caribbean

Geography
- Coordinates: 11.99000°N 68.64300°W
- Area: 1.7 km^{2} (0.66 sq mi)

Administration
- Kingdom of the Netherlands
- Country: Curaçao

Demographics
- Population: 0

Ramsar Wetland
- Official name: Klein Curaçao
- Designated: 31 July 2018
- Reference no.: 2355
- Klein Curaçao Lighthouse
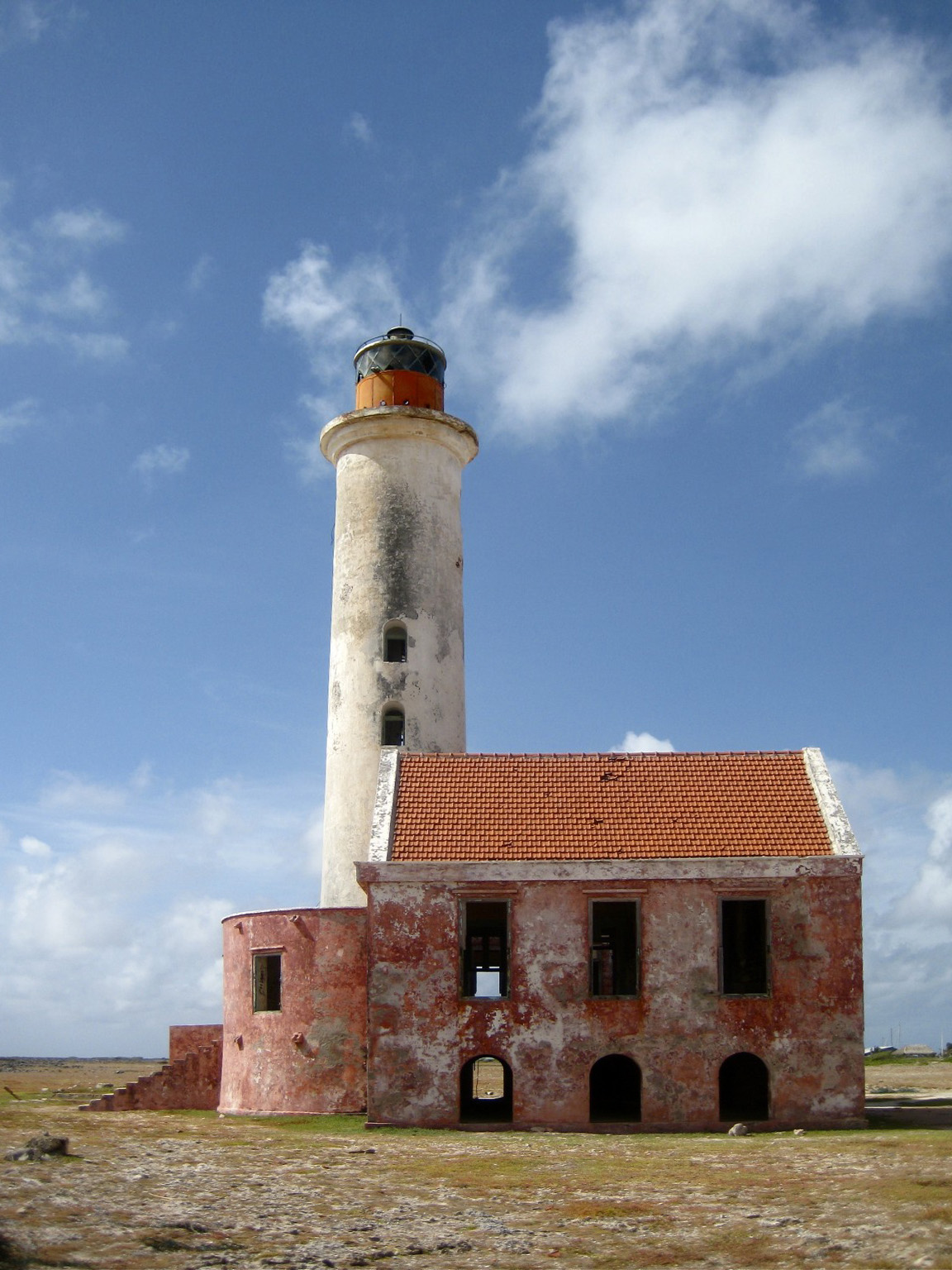
- The lighthouse at Klein Curaçao stands 22 meters tall and is lit by a solar-powered LED light
- Constructed: 1850 (first); 1879 (rebuilt)
- Construction: masonry tower
- Height: 20 m (66 ft)
- Shape: cylindrical tower with balcony and lantern
- Markings: white tower, red lantern
- Power source: solar power
- First lit: 1913 (rebuilt)
- Focal height: 25 m (82 ft)
- Range: 15 nmi (28 km; 17 mi)
- Characteristic: Fl(2) W 15s

Klein Curaçao (English: Little Curaçao) is a 1.7-square-kilometre (170 ha; 0.66 sq mi) uninhabited island belonging to, and lying 10 km south-east of, Curaçao, a constituent country of the Kingdom of the Netherlands in the Dutch Caribbean.

== Description ==
Klein Curaçao has a desert climate (in the Köppen climate classification BWh and BWk), a climate in which there is an excess of evaporation over precipitation. The only structures on the island are an old lighthouse, a beach house, and several huts. Klein Curaçao is well known as a beautiful diving spot because of its coral and underwater caves. The island has no permanent inhabitants, only a few palm-frond-covered sheds for day trippers from Curaçao, and apart from some coconut palms has little vegetation. There are some fishermen's huts where fishermen normally stay for some days. They get water from the Coast Guard of Curaçao. The windward side is a graveyard for boats that did not stay out far enough or lost power. A small tanker, the Maria Bianca Guidesman, is gradually being demolished by the constant pounding of the waves since 1988. The remains of four or five boats have been washed far onshore. As with Curaçao, hurricanes are few, but several storms have left their mark; the 1877 hurricane destroyed the first lighthouse. The next lighthouse, which still survives, was built in the interior of the island.

== History ==
Klein Curaçao played a role in the transatlantic slave trade. The Dutch West India Company transported many enslaved people from Africa to Curaçao. Before arriving on the main island, the sick were quarantined on Klein Curaçao, where the remains of the first quarantine building can still be seen in the northwest. Those who did not survive the journey, including enslaved Africans and other passengers, were buried on the island, with several graves still present in its southern part.

The Dutch West India Company also held licenses to hunt the now-extinct Caribbean monk seal on Klein Curaçao. In 1871, English mining engineer John Godden visited the island and discovered a significant phosphate deposit. From 1871 to 1886, the Dutch government operated phosphate mines there, exporting the mineral to Europe.

== Environment ==
Once the phosphate was mined out, the level of the island dropped, and seabird populations plummeted. The island is now approximately 3 metres (9.8 ft) lower than it was before mining began. Goats were once allowed to roam the island, which contributed to its desertification. The goats were eradicated in 1996, as were feral cats by 2004. Reforestation is being undertaken by CARMABI Marine Research Station, Curaçao. The island was designated as a protected Ramsar site in 2018. It has also been identified as an Important Bird Area by BirdLife International as a nesting site for least terns, while its shores are used seasonally by large numbers of migratory waders. With the elimination of the goats and cats, the island has the potential to become an important seabird nesting location. Hawksbill, loggerhead and green sea turtles nest on the island's beaches.

== Gallery ==
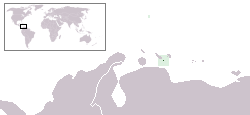
Location of Klein Curaçao

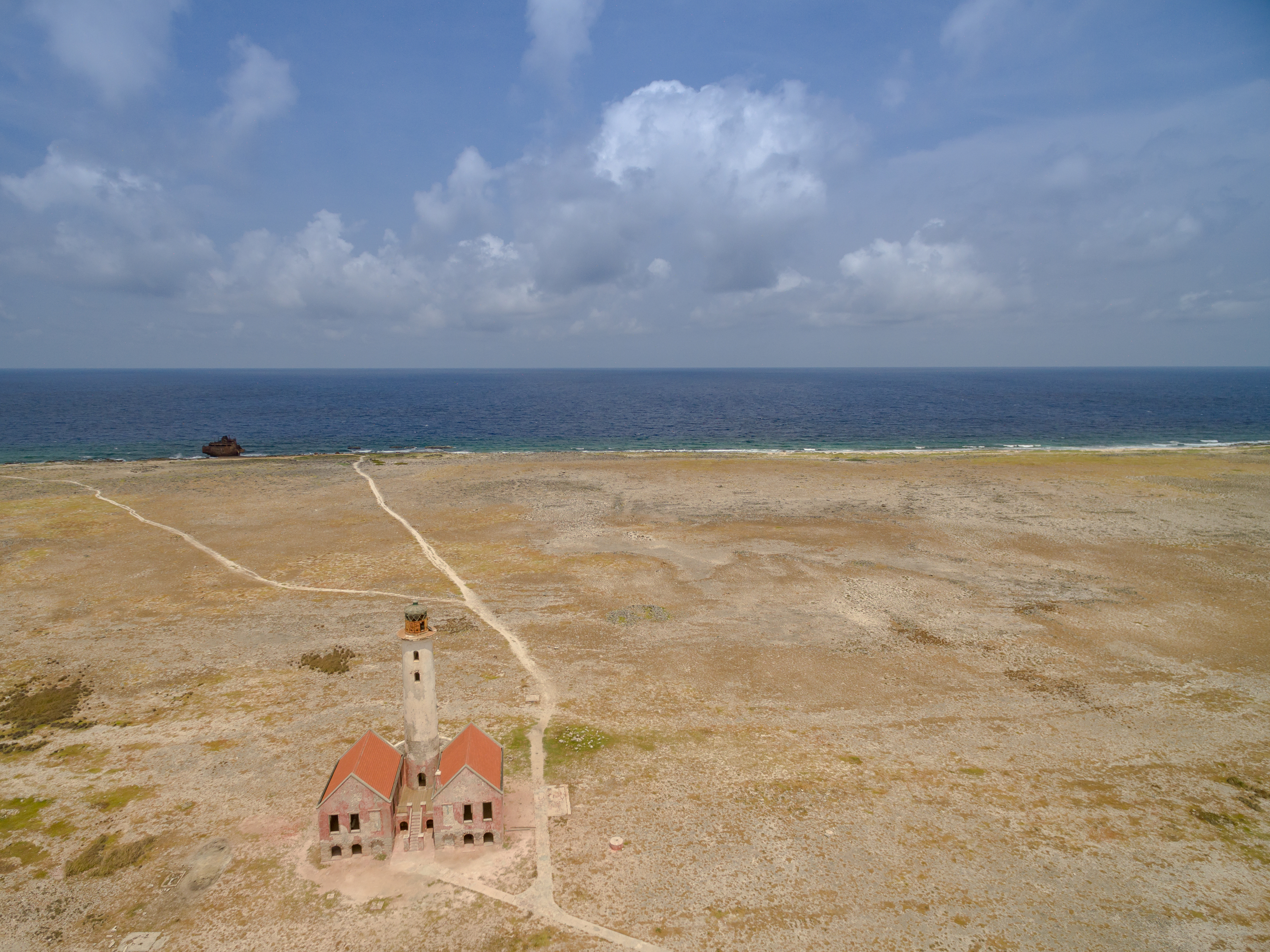
Klein Curaçao lighthouse

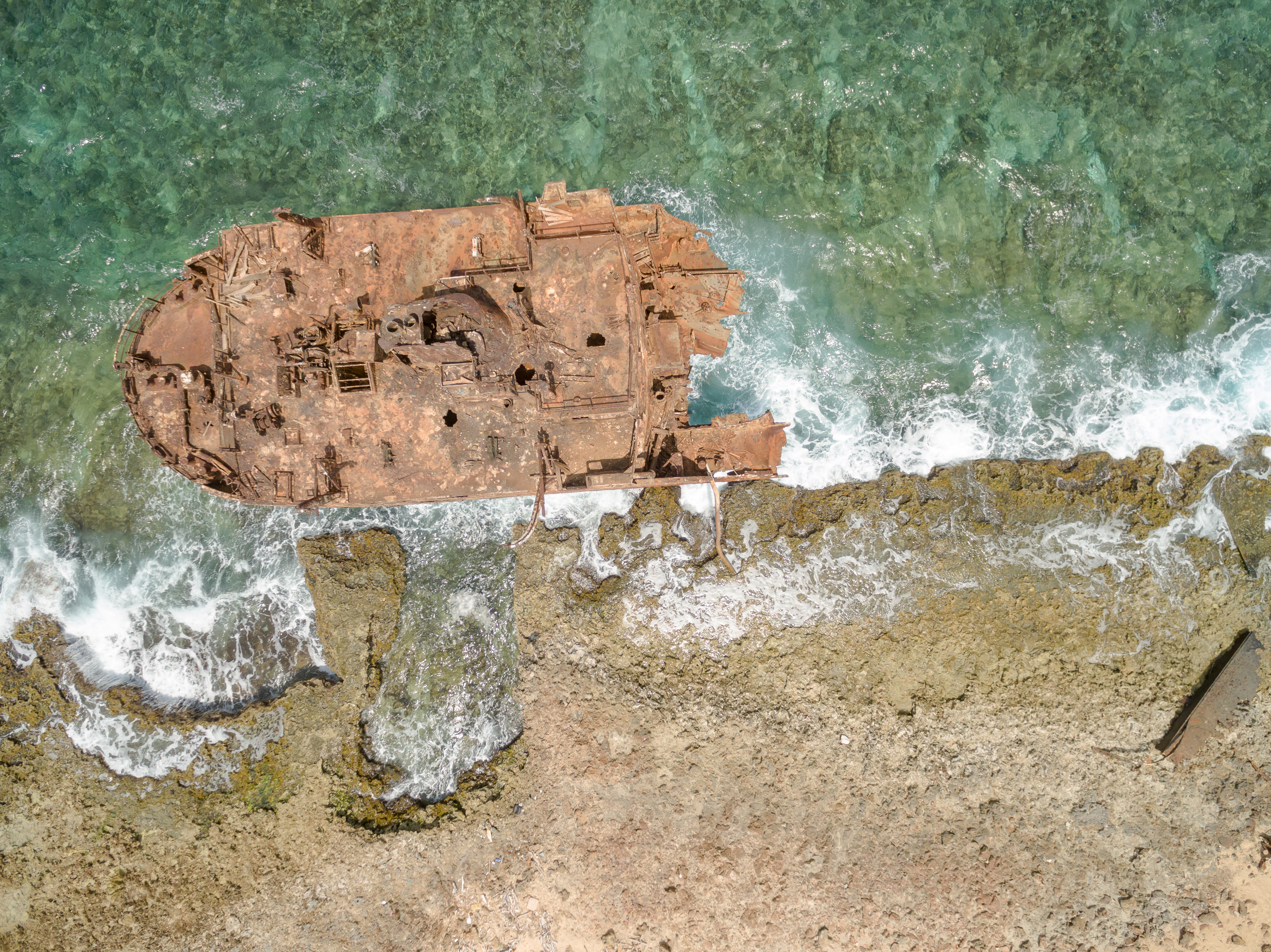
Maria Bianca Guidesman aerial view

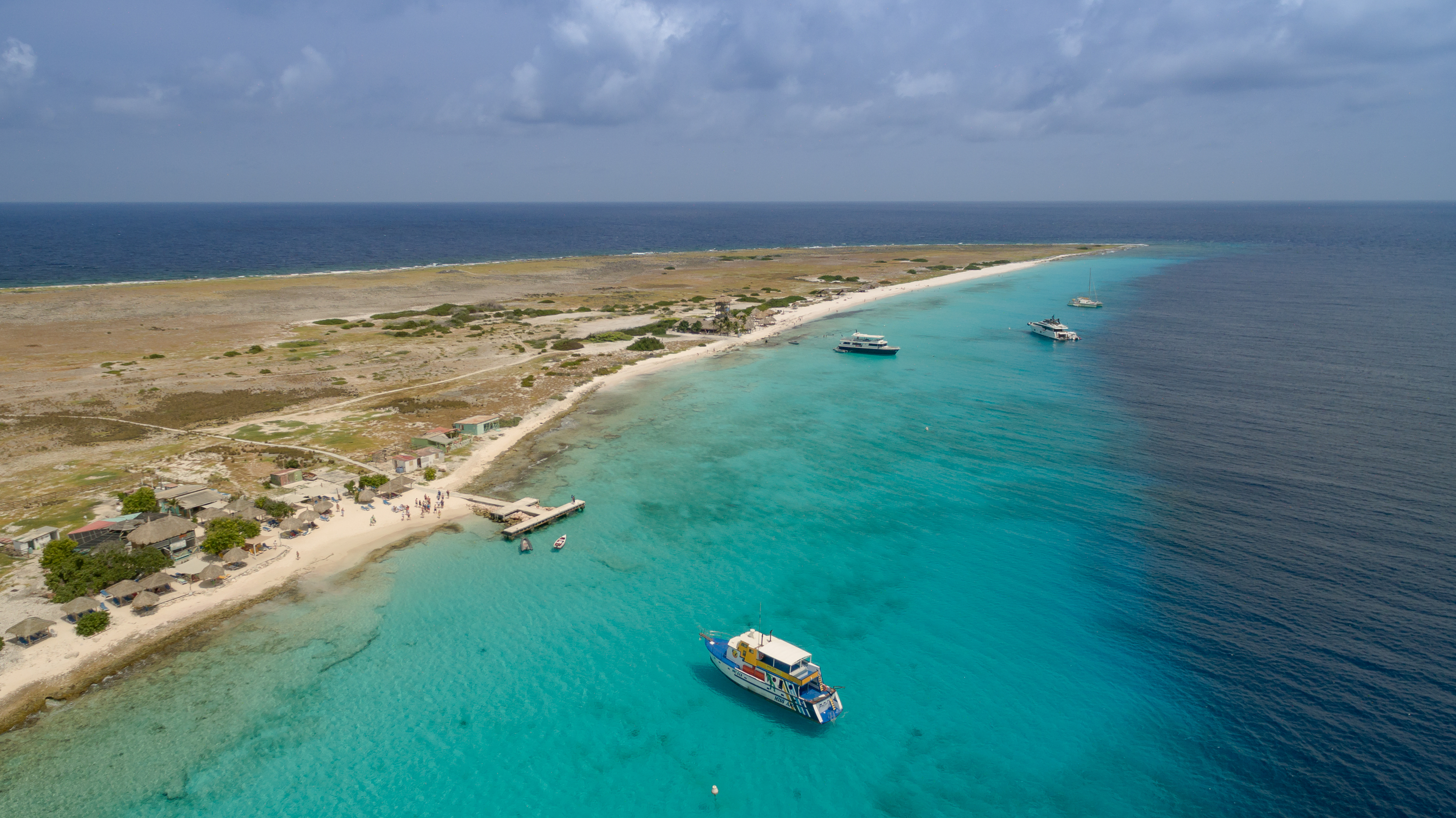
Klein Curaçao beach

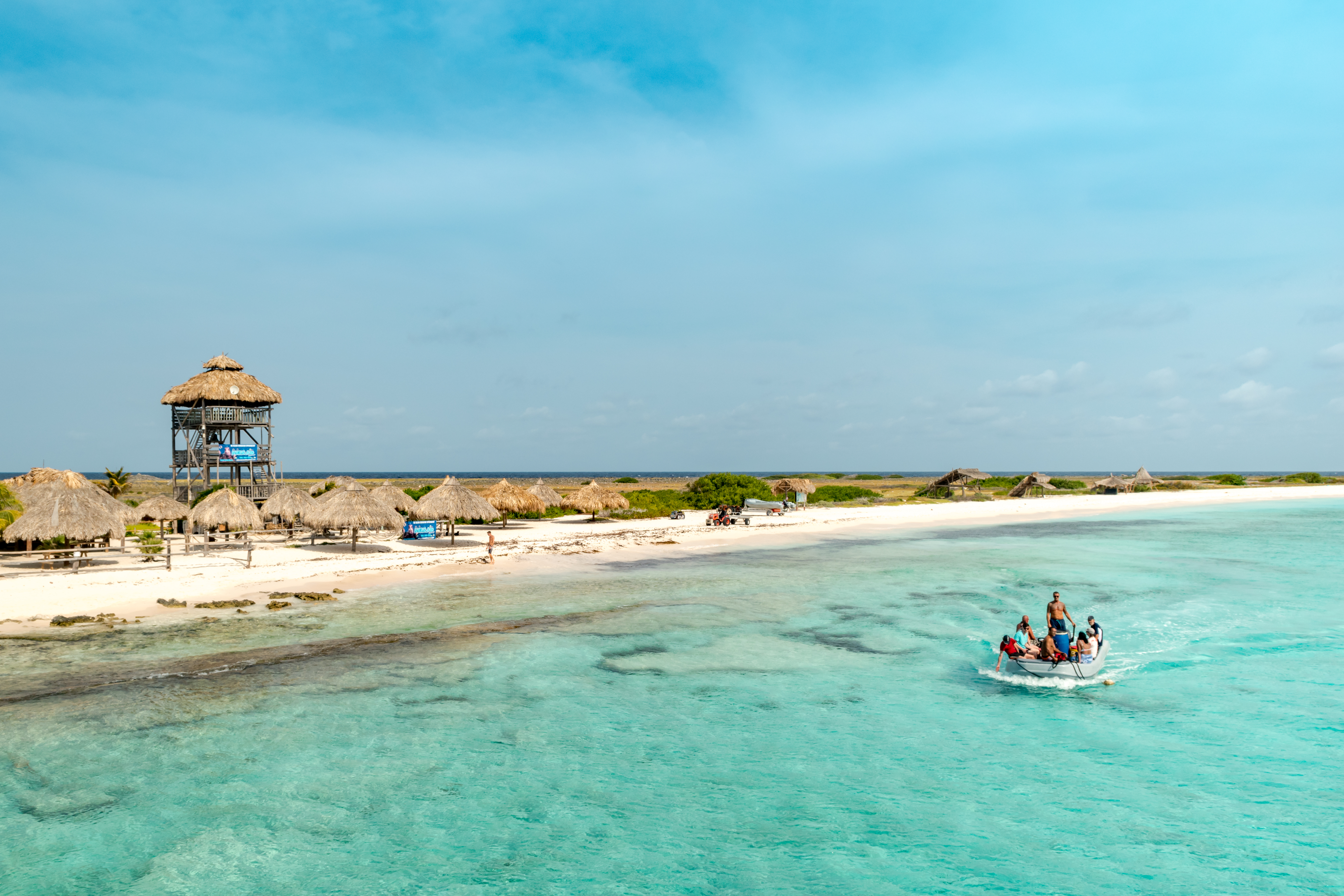
Klein Curaçao

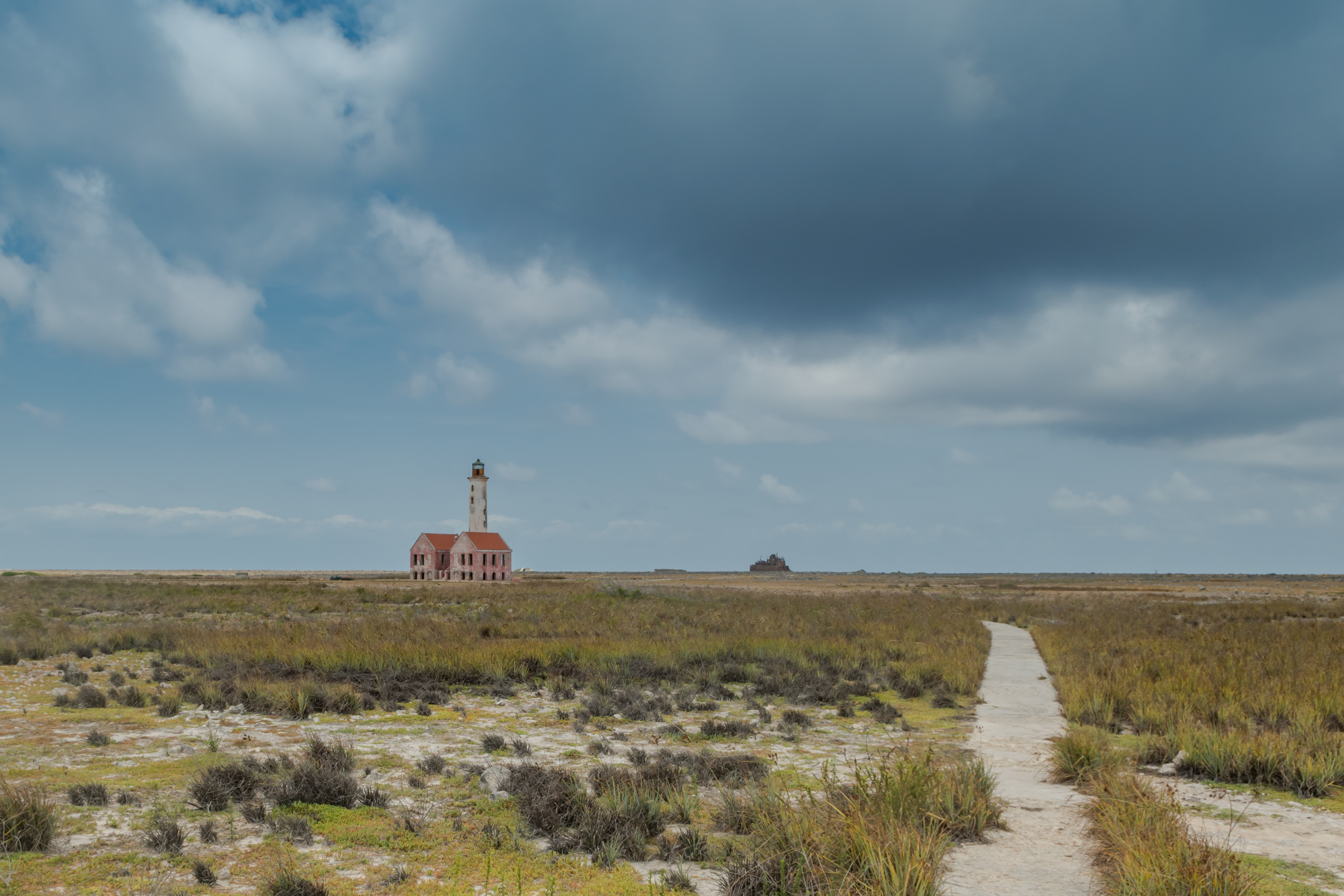
Klein Curaçao lighthouse

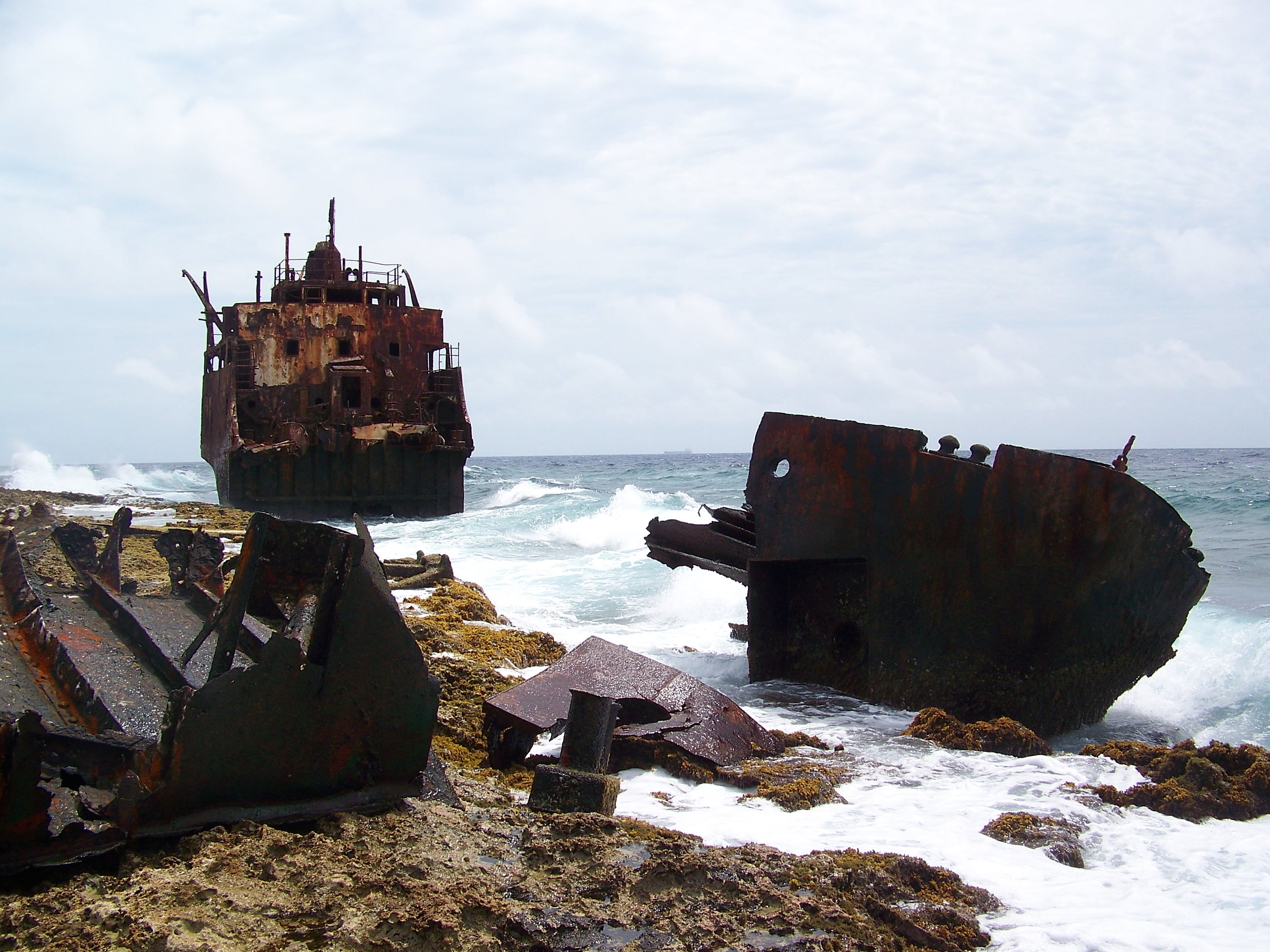
Maria Bianca Guidesman Shipwreck

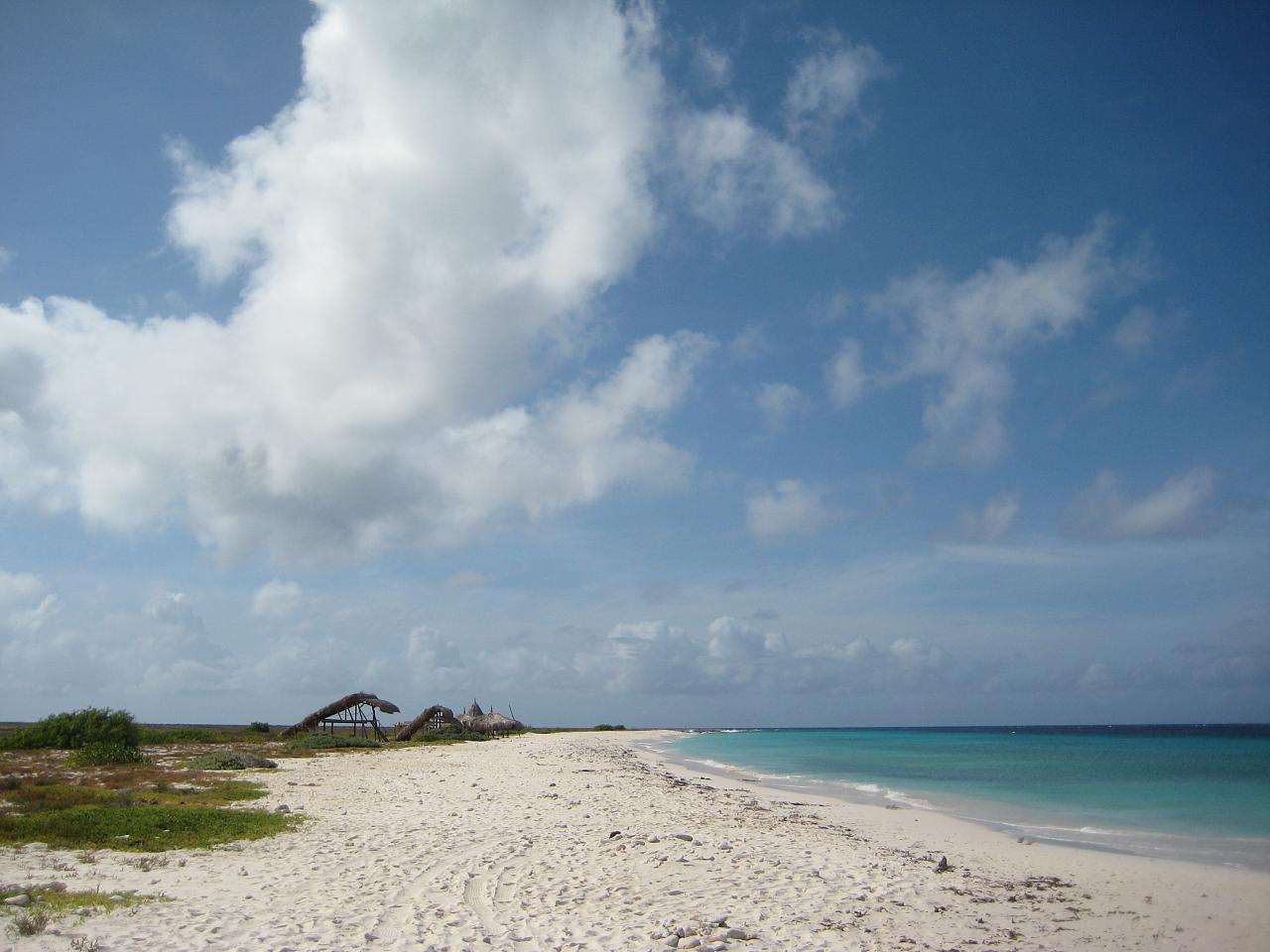
Beach at Klein Curaçao

== See also ==
- List of lighthouses in Curaçao
