= Qanuni =

Qanuni is a surname. Notable people with the surname include:

- Jalal Qanuni (1900–?), Iranian classical musician
- Yunus Qanuni (born 1957), Afghan politician

== See also ==
- Qanun (disambiguation)
