= 8 cm kanon vz. 28 =

- Type: Field gun
- Place of origin: Czechoslovakia

Service history
- In service: 1928–1945
- Used by: See users
- Wars: World War II

Production history
- Designer: Škoda Works
- Designed: 1928
- Manufacturer: Škoda Works
- Produced: 1928
- Variants: 8 cm kanon vz. 30; 75 mm Škoda Model 1928

Specifications
- Mass: Combat: 1,816 kg (4,004 lb); Travel: 2,977 kg (6,563 lb)
- Barrel length: 3.06 m (10.0 ft) L/40
- Shell: Fixed QF 76.5 x 346mm R
- Shell weight: 8 kg (17 lb 10 oz)
- Caliber: 76.5 mm (3 in)
- Breech: Horizontal sliding wedge
- Recoil: hydro-pneumatic
- Carriage: Two-wheeled Box trail
- Elevation: -8° to +80°
- Traverse: 360° with firing table
- Rate of fire: 10-12 rpm
- Muzzle velocity: 600 metres per second (2,000 ft/s)
- Maximum firing range: 13.5 km (8.4 mi)

The 8 cm kanon vz. 28 (Cannon model 1928) was a Czech field gun used during World War II.

== Design & history ==
The origins of the 8 cm kanon vz. 28 began in 1928 at the Škoda Works in Plzeň. The design attempted to combine the field gun, mountain gun, and anti-aircraft gun roles into one weapon. The vz. 28 combined a two-wheeled box trail carriage, horizontal sliding wedge breech, hydro-pneumatic recoil system, high angle elevation and a firing table for 360° degree traverse. Notably, for the first time among field guns it featured a muzzle brake, one of the designs by company's engineer Bohdan Pantoflíček patented in 1927. For the mountain gun role it could be broken down into three pieces for transport, a feature also shared by the contemporary 10 cm houfnice vz. 28 and the later 8 cm kanon vz. 30 and 10 cm houfnice vz. 30 guns.

The vz. 28 proved to be fairly successful as a field and mountain gun, but was a failure as an anti-aircraft gun due to very quick developments in aviation during the following decade. The Czech Army used the vz. 28 in limited numbers, but ordered its successor the vz. 30 in larger numbers. The vz. 30 lacked the vz. 28's firing table, otherwise their configuration, dimensions, and performance were largely the same.

The Yugoslav Army ordered the vz. 28 who referred to it as the 80 mm M.28. The Romanian Army also ordered a 75 mm version the 75 mm Škoda Model 1928 which it used during World War II. Guns captured from Yugoslavia by the Germans were given the designation 7.65 cm FK 304(j).

== Users ==
- Argentina
- Czechoslovakia
- Nazi Germany
- Romania
- Yugoslavia
