= Muzzle brake =

Anti-recoil gunbarrel attachment

Schematic of various forms of muzzle brakes

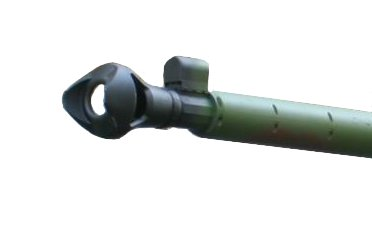
The muzzle brake of the 105mm main gun on an AMX 10 RC armoured fighting vehicle

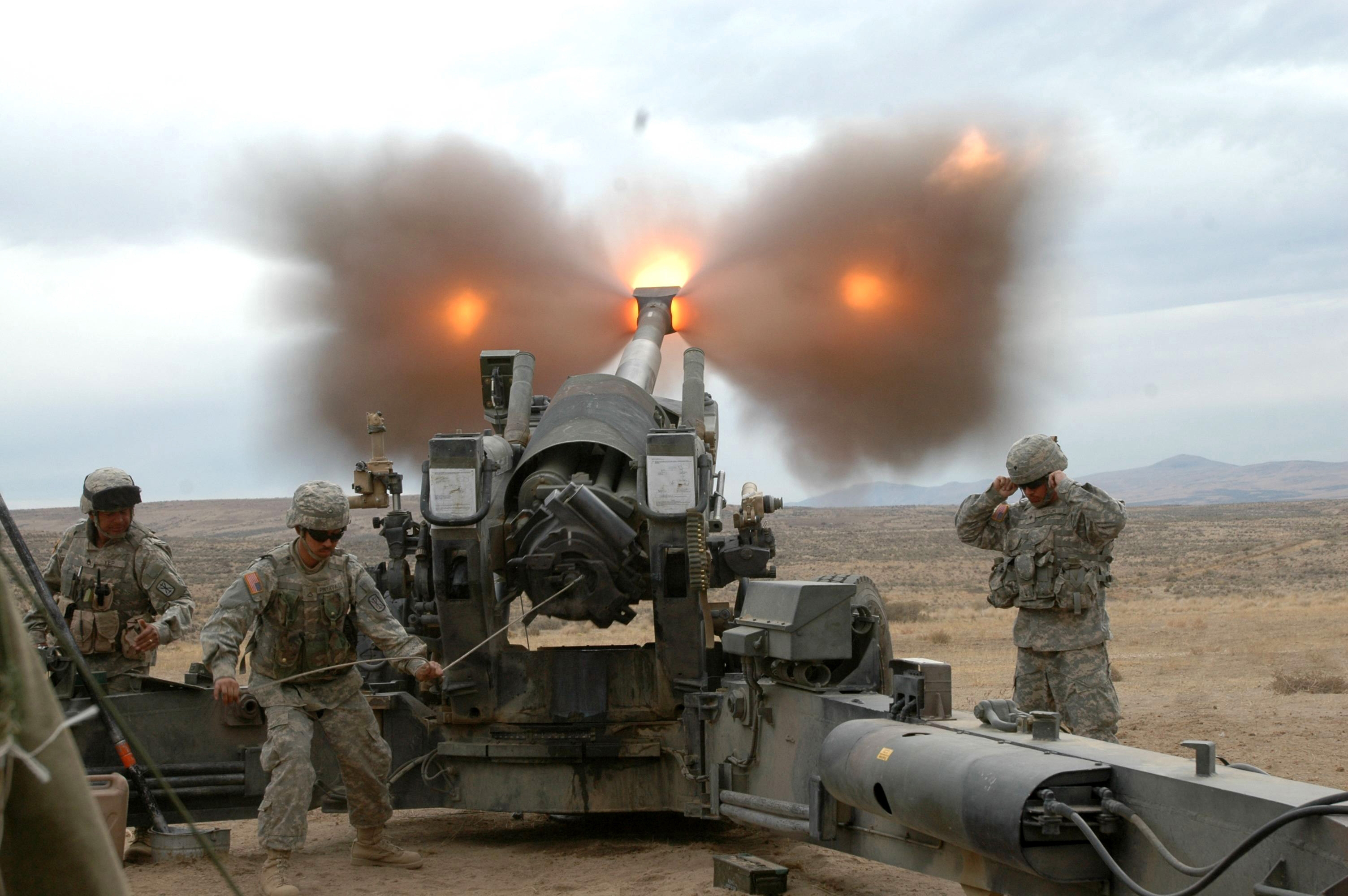
The muzzle brake of an M198 155mm howitzer venting propellant gases sideways as the howitzer is fired

A muzzle brake or recoil compensator is a device connected to, or a feature integral (ported barrel) to the construction of, the muzzle or barrel of a firearm or cannon that is intended to redirect a portion of propellant gases to counter recoil and unwanted muzzle rise. Barrels with an integral muzzle brake are often said to be ported.

The concept of a muzzle brake was first introduced for artillery. It was a common feature on many anti-tank guns, especially those mounted on tanks, in order to reduce the area needed to take up the strokes of recoil and kickback. They have been used in various forms for rifles and pistols to help control recoil and the rising of the barrel that normally occurs after firing. They are used on pistols for practical pistol competitions, and are usually called compensators in this context.

== History ==
The concept of a muzzle brake had been experimented with for many years prior to its successful implementation: in 1922, a US Army Ordnance Department official stated in US Congress that "the muzzle brake was used in another form 20 years ago, and even longer ago than that, but it has never been successfully applied".

Antoine Treuille de Beaulieu invented a prototype based on the idea in 1842 and had it tested in 1862, but he himself called the idea "too new". A US patent was issued for a "recoil obviator" in 1871 (there is no indication it was ever tested), while an experimental British anti-tank rifle in 1918 featured a muzzle brake, but was not adopted.

In the later 1920s, there was some limited progress: around 1926, Cutts compensator became an option in the Thompson SMG (R. M. Cutts' earliest patent is from 1925), in 1927 Škoda patented a family of muzzle brake designs, one of which was used on 8 cm kanon vz. 28, and in 1928, Schneider et Cie (which was allied with Škoda at the time) updated their 220 mm TR mle 1915/1916 with a muzzle brake patented by Eugène Schneider II way back in 1912.

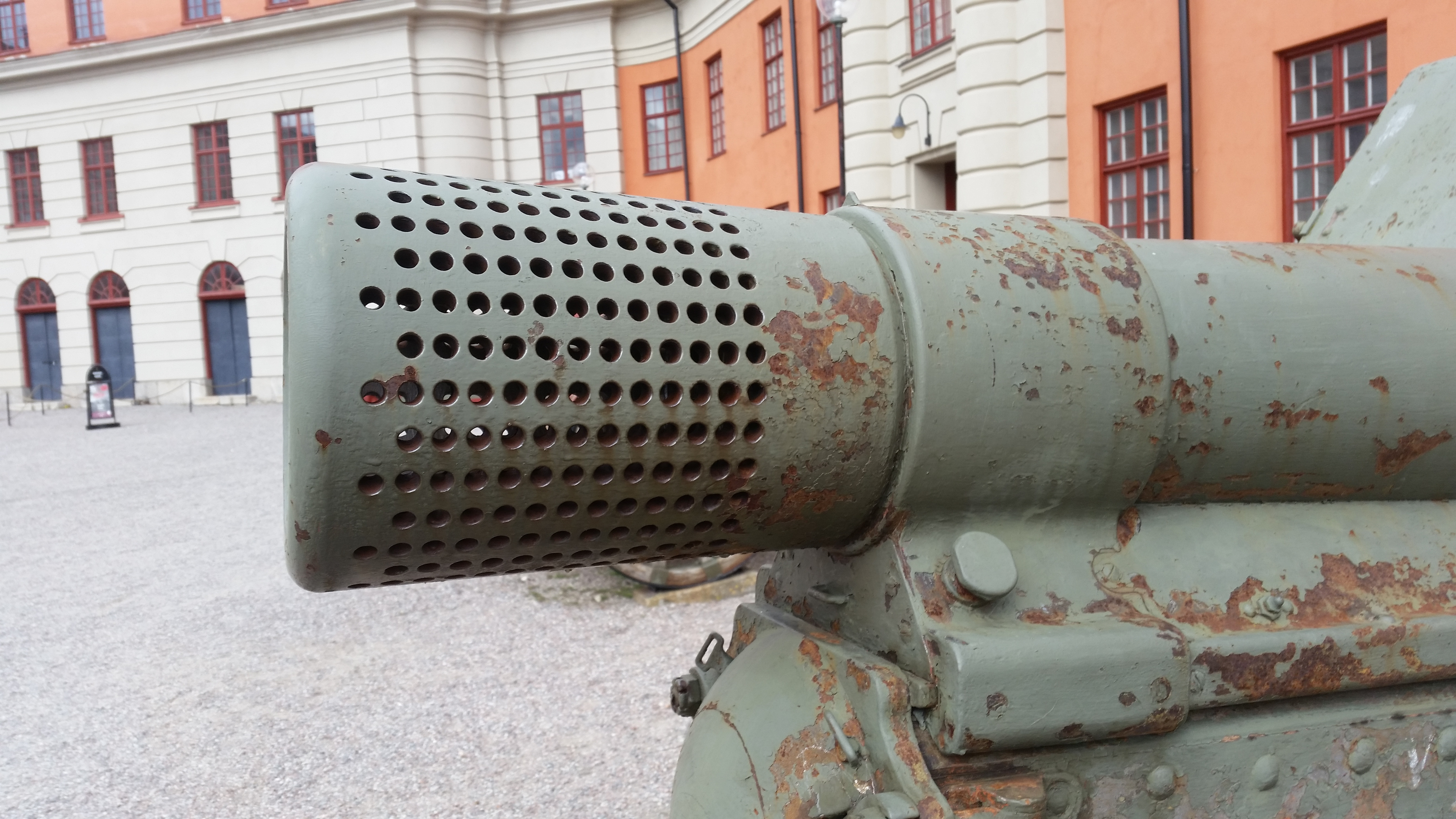
Pepper-pot muzzle brake ("Jentzen-brake") on a Bofors “15 cm haub M/19” howitzer.

In mid-1930s, Bofors designed several successful artillery pieces (e. g. 37-mm and 105-mm guns) with new perforated muzzle brakes, so-called pepper-pot muzzle brakes, a design invented by then Swedish artillery captain Harald Jentzen and therefore known in Sweden as a "Jentzen-brake" (Swedish: Jentzen-broms). The Soviet Union started modernizing old artillery systems with new barrels, such as the 107 mm gun M1910/30, 152 mm gun M1910/30 etc., predominantly featuring cylindrical muzzle brakes with long slits on each side. Several European countries started designing and producing anti-tank rifles featuring muzzle brakes.

== Rationale in firearms ==
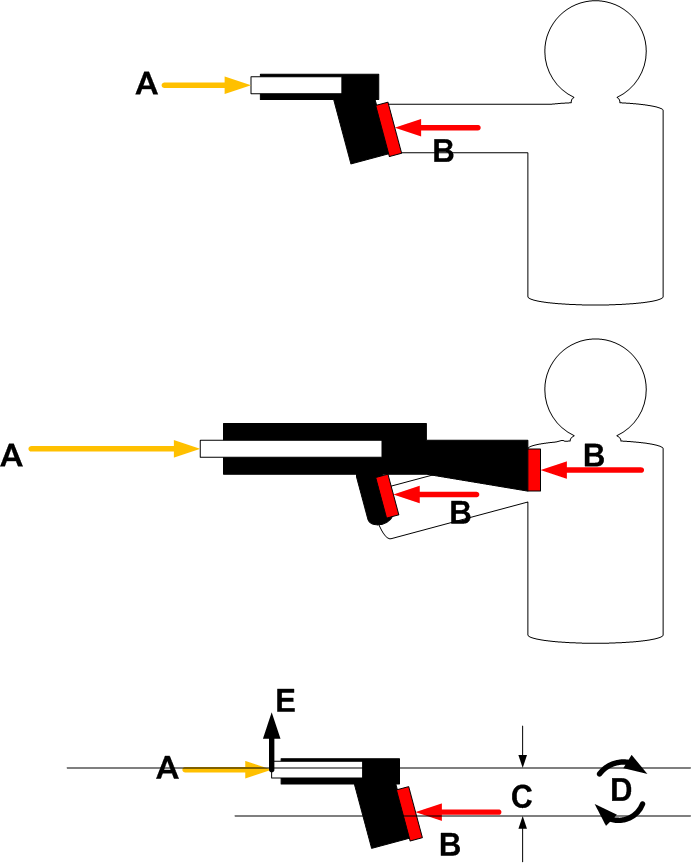
Illustration of forces in muzzle rise. Projectile and propellant gases act on barrel along barrel center line A. The shooter resists the forces by contact with the gun at grips and stock B. The height difference between barrel centerline and average point of contact is height C. The forces A and B operating over moment arm/height C create torque or moment D, which rotates the firearm's muzzle up as illustrated at E

The interchangeable terms muzzle rise, muzzle flip, or muzzle climb refer to the tendency of a handheld firearm's front end (the muzzle end of the barrel) to rise after firing. Firearms with less height from the grip line to the barrel centerline tend to experience less muzzle rise.

The muzzle rises primarily because, for most firearms, the centerline of the barrel is above the center of contact between the shooter and the firearm's grip and stock. The reactive forces from the fired bullet and propellant gases exiting the muzzle act directly down the centerline of the barrel. If that line of force is above the center of the contact points, this creates a moment or torque (rotational force) that causes the firearm to rotate and the muzzle to rise.

== Design and construction ==
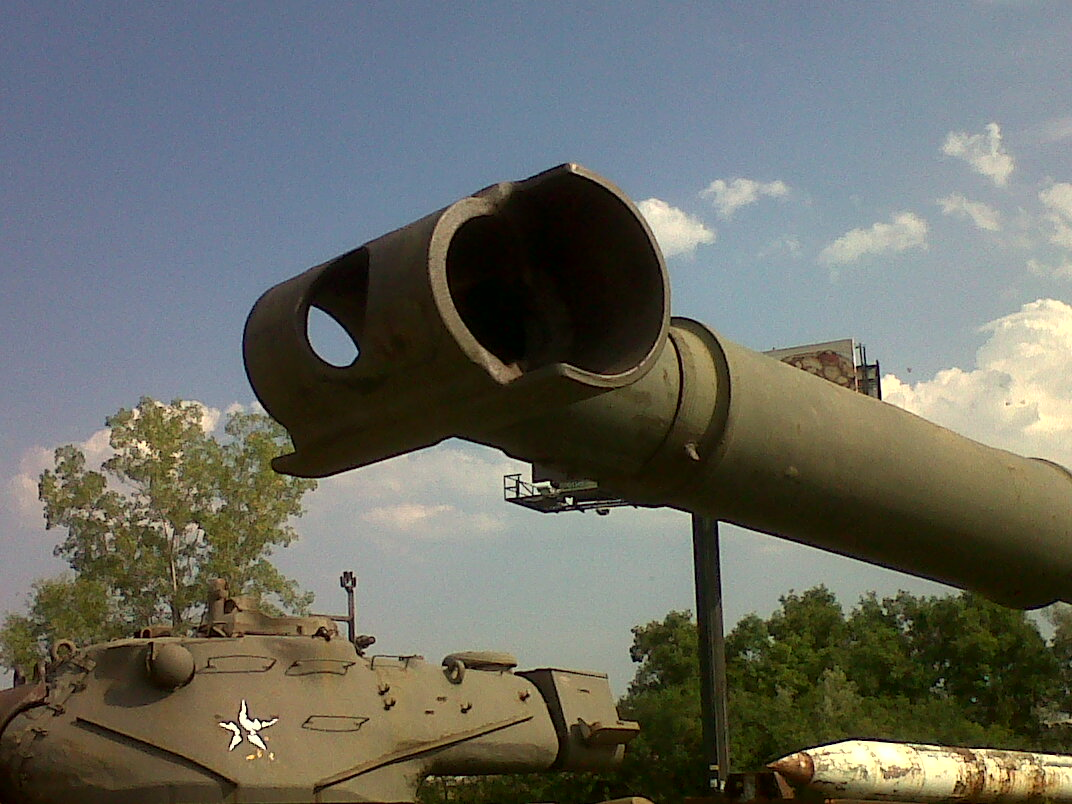
Muzzle brake on M47 Patton tank

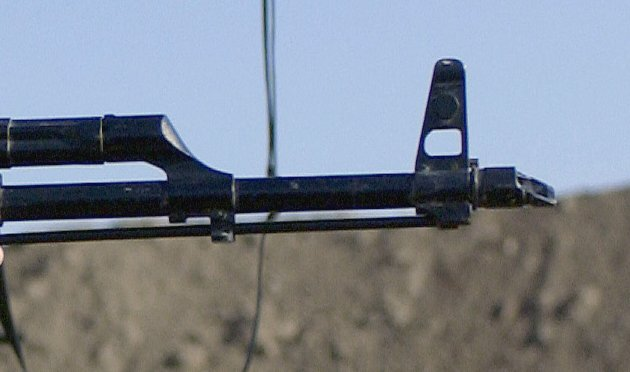
The AKM rifle's slant-cut compensator

Some muzzle brake designs use baffles and expansion chambers to slow escaping gases. Ports are often added to the expansion chambers, producing the long, multi-chambered recoil compensators often seen on IPSC raceguns.

Another simple method is porting, where holes or slots are machined into the barrel near the muzzle to allow the gas to escape.

== Porting ==
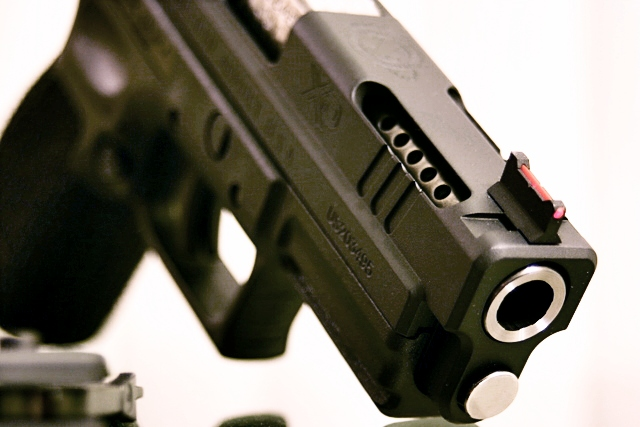
Springfield Armory, Inc., custom XD-40 V-10 with ported barrel and slide

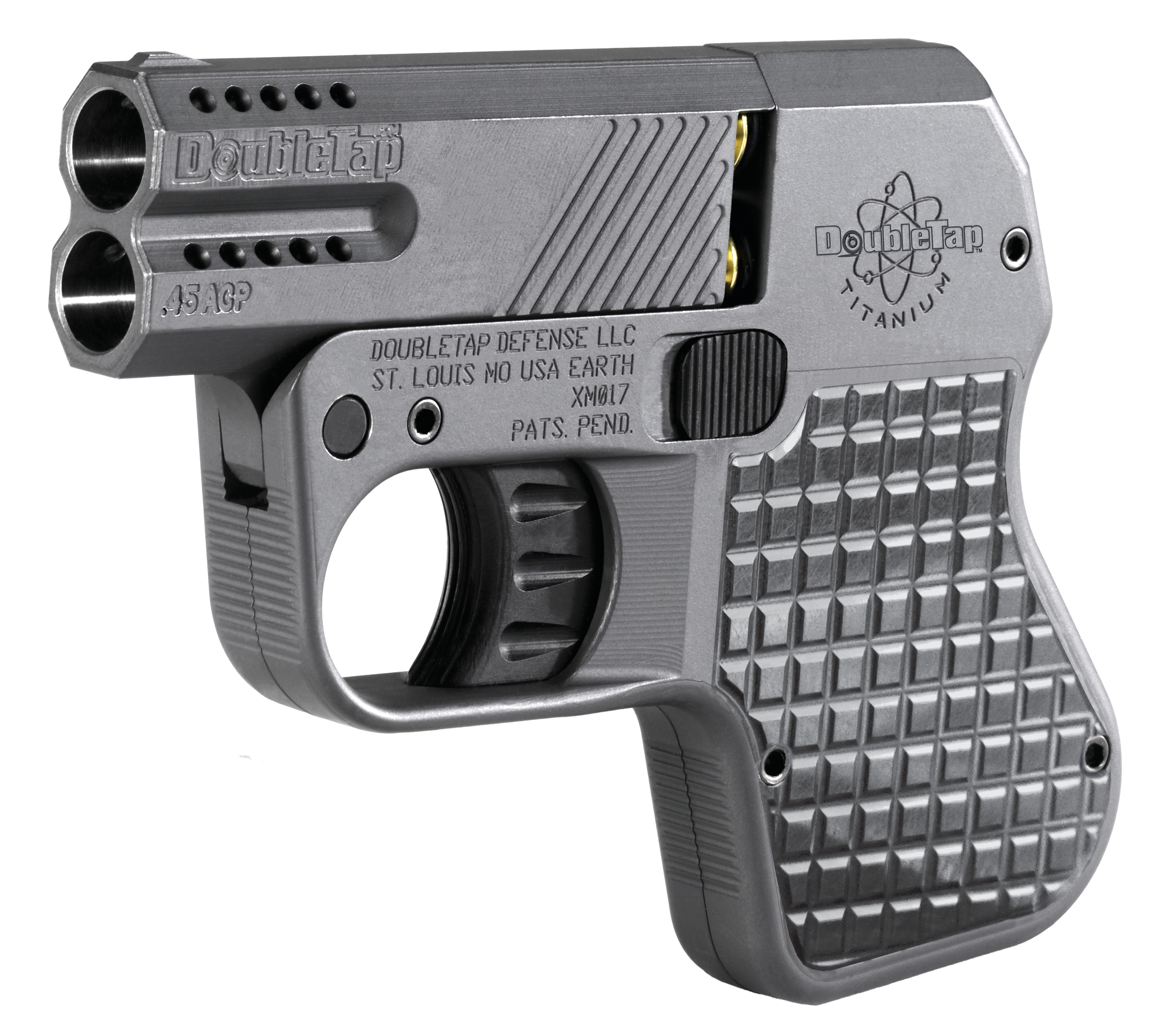
DoubleTap .45ACP derringer with ported barrels

Porting typically involves precision-drilled ports or holes in the forward top part of the barrel. These holes divert a portion of the gases expelled prior to the departure of the projectile in a direction that reduces the tendency of the firearm to rise. The concept is an application of Newton's third law; the exhaust directed upward causes a reciprocal force downward.

== Disadvantages ==
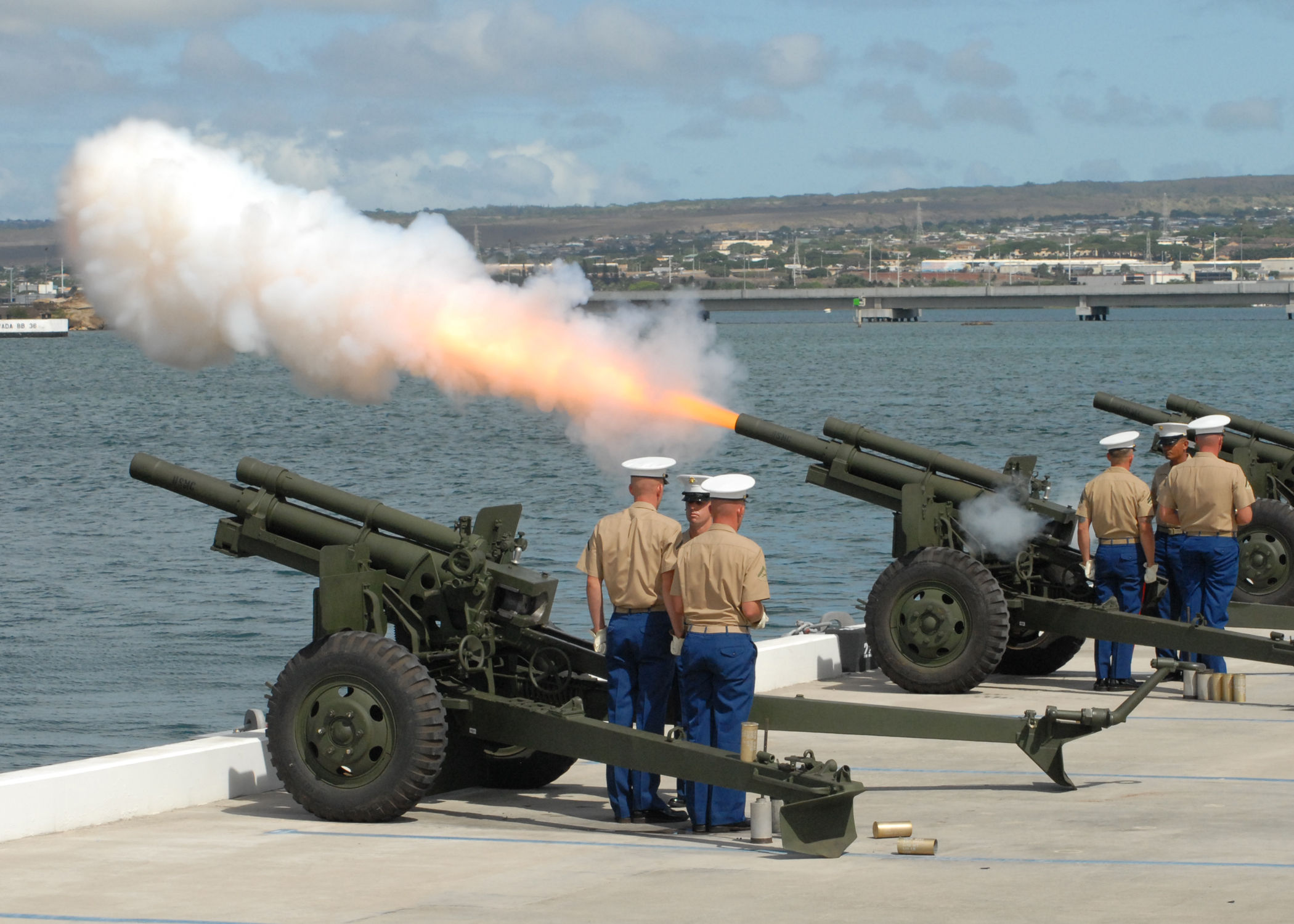
Muzzle flash without muzzle brake

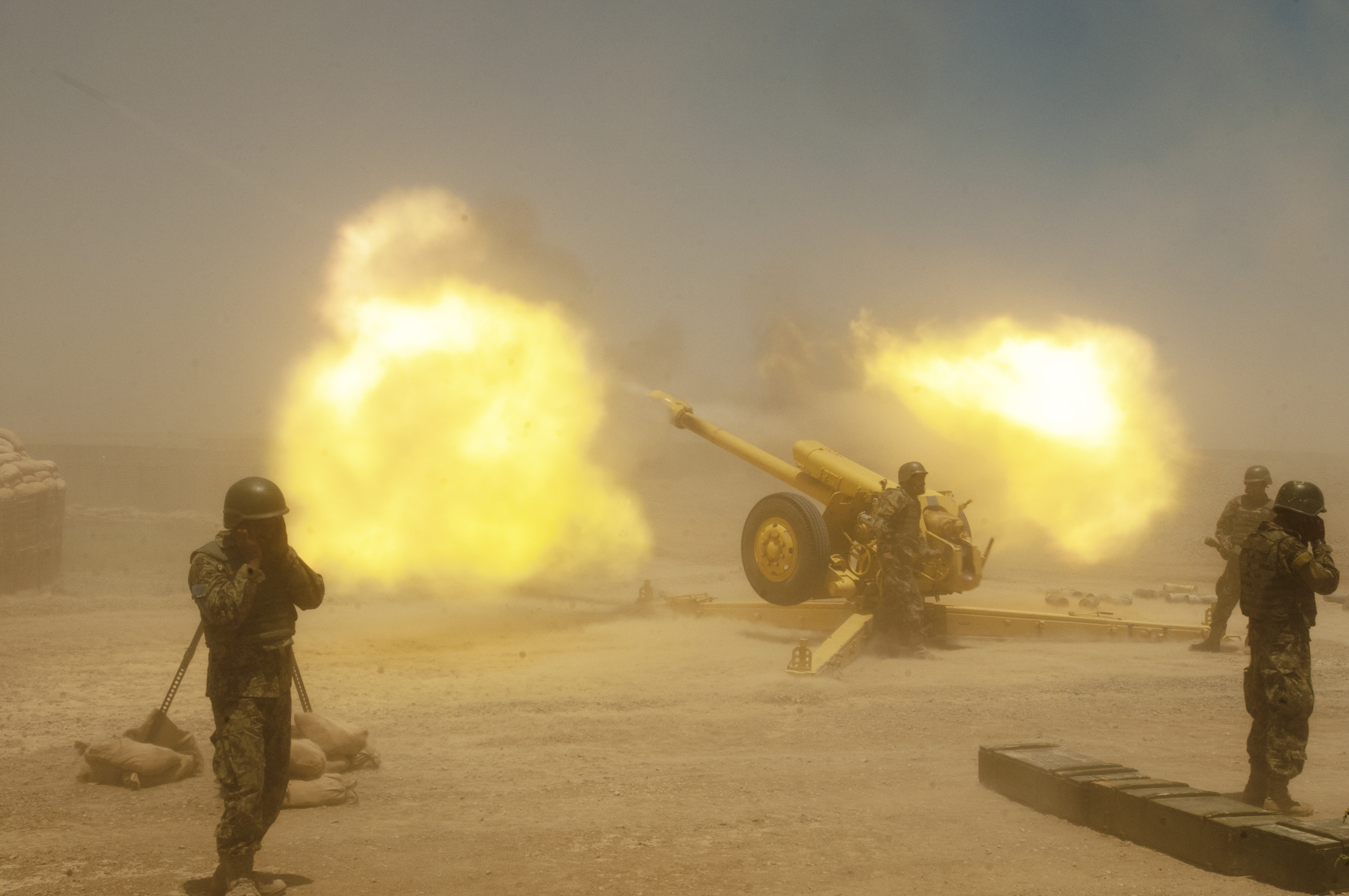
Redirected muzzle flash with muzzle brake

The shooter, gun crew, or close bystanders may perceive an increase in sound pressure level as well as an increase in muzzle blast and lead exposure. This occurs because the pressure waves (including sound), flash, and lead-loaded smoke plume normally projected away from the shooter are now partially redirected to the side or sometimes at partially backward angles toward the shooter or gun crew. Standard eye and ear protection, important for all shooters, may not be adequate to avoid hearing damage with the muzzle blast partially vectored back toward the gun crew or spotters by arrowhead-shaped reactive muzzle brakes found on sniper teams firing anti-materiel rifles like the Barrett M82.

Measurements indicate that on a rifle, a muzzle brake presumably redirecting its gases at least somewhat backward adds 5 to 10 dB to the normal noise level perceived by the shooter, increasing total noise levels up to 160 dB(A) ± 3 dB. Painful discomfort occurs at approximately 120 to 125 dB(A), with some references claiming 133 dB(A) for the threshold of pain.

Brakes and compensators also add length, mass, and typically diameter to the muzzle end of a firearm, where it most influences its handling and may interfere with accuracy, as muzzle rise will occur when the brake is removed and shooting without the brake can throw off the strike of the round.

Another problem can occur when saboted ammunition is used, as the sabot tends to break up inside the brake. The problem is particularly pronounced when armour-piercing fin-stabilized discarding-sabot (APFSDS), a type of long-rod penetrator (LRP) (or kinetic energy penetrator), are used.

A serious tactical disadvantage of muzzle brakes on both small arms and artillery is that, depending on their designs, they may cause escaping gases to throw up dust and debris clouds that impair visibility and reveal one's position, not to mention posing a hazard to individuals without eye protection. Troops often wet the ground in front of antitank guns in defensive emplacements to prevent this, and snipers are specially trained in techniques for suppressing or concealing the magnified effects of lateral muzzle blast when firing rifles with such brakes.

The redirection of larger amounts of escaping high-pressure gas can cause discomfort caused by blast-induced sinus cavity concussion. Such discomfort can especially become a problem for anti-materiel rifle shooters due to the larger than normal cartridges with accompanying large case capacities and propellant volumes these rifles use and can be a reason for promoting accelerated shooter fatigue and flinching. Furthermore, the redirected blast may direct pressure waves toward the eye, potentially leading to retinal detachment when repeated shooting is performed with anti-materiel and large caliber weapons.

== Ported chamber ==
A barrel chamber with pressure relief ports that allow gas to leak around the cartridge during extraction. Basically the opposite of a fluted chamber, as it is intended for the cartridge to stick to the chamber wall, introducing a slight delay in extraction. This requires a welded-on sleeve with an annular groove to contain the pressure.

== US legislation and regulation ==
The State of California outlaws flash suppressors on semiautomatic rifles with detachable magazines, but allows muzzle brakes to be used instead.

The Bureau of Alcohol, Tobacco, Firearms, and Explosives (ATF) made a regulatory determination in 2013 that the muzzle device of the SIG Sauer MPX Carbine, adapted from the baffle core of the integrally suppressed version's suppressor and claimed by SIG to be a muzzle brake, constituted a silencer and rendered the MPX-C a Title II NFA weapon. SIG Sauer, the rifle's maker, sued the ATF in 2014 to have the designation overturned. In September 2015, Federal Judge Paul Barbadora upheld the ATF's ruling; despite SIG successfully establishing that the muzzle device did not suppress the weapon's sound, the ATF successfully established that it was intended to suppress the sound, which was legally sufficient.

== See also ==
- Flash suppressor
- Muzzle booster
- Muzzle shroud
- Silencer (firearms)
- Glossary of firearms terms
