= 10 cm houfnice vz. 28 =

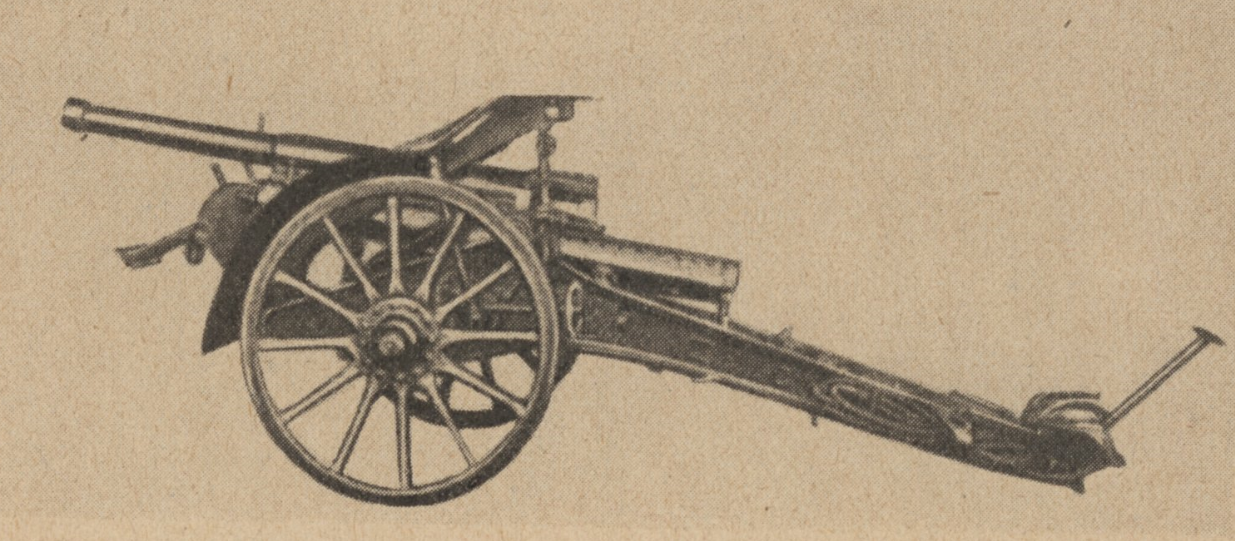
- Type: Howitzer
- Place of origin: Czechoslovakia

Service history
- In service: 1928–1945
- Used by: Nazi Germany; Yugoslavia
- Wars: World War II

Production history
- Designer: Škoda Works
- Designed: 1928
- Manufacturer: Škoda Works
- Produced: 1928
- No. built: 20?

Specifications
- Mass: Combat: 1,798 kg (3,964 lb); Travel: 3,509 kg (7,736 lb)
- Barrel length: 2.5 m (8.2 ft) L/25
- Crew: 6-8
- Shell weight: 14 kg (30 lb 14 oz)
- Caliber: 10 cm (3.9 in)
- Breech: Horizontal sliding-wedge
- Recoil: Hydro-pneumatic
- Carriage: Two-wheeled box trail
- Elevation: -8° to +80°
- Traverse: 11°
- Muzzle velocity: 450 m/s (1,500 ft/s)
- Maximum firing range: 10.7 km (6.6 mi)

The 10 cm houfnice vz. 28 (howitzer model 28) was a Czech howitzer used in limited numbers by the Yugoslav Army during World War II. The Yugoslavs ordered twenty houfnice vz. 28 guns which they referred to as the 100 mm M.28. Guns captured from Yugoslavia by the Germans were given the designation 10 cm leFH 317(j).

== Design & history ==
The origins of the houfnice vz. 28 began in 1928 at the Škoda Works in Plzeň. The design attempted to combine the howitzer and mountain gun roles into one weapon. The houfnice vz. 28 combined a two-wheeled box trail carriage, horizontal sliding-wedge breech, Hydro-pneumatic recoil system and high angle elevation. For the mountain gun role it could be broken down into three pieces for transport, a feature also shared by the contemporary 8 cm kanon vz. 28 and the later 8 cm kanon vz. 30 and 10 cm houfnice vz. 30 guns. The Czech Army declined to adopt the houfnice vz. 28, but ordered its successor the houfnice vz. 30 in larger numbers. The vz. 30 and vz. 28 shared a similar configuration, dimensions and their performance was largely the same.
