= List of lighthouses in Curaçao =

This is a list of lighthouses in Curaçao.

== Lighthouses ==
Name	Image	Year built	Location & coordinates	Class of Light	Focal height	NGA number	Admiralty number	Range nml
Kaap St. Marie Lighthouse	Image	n/a	Sint Willibrordus; 12°11′14.9″N 69°03′37.5″W	Fl (2) W 6s.	6 metres (20 ft)	15968	J6374	9
Klein Curaçao Lighthouse		1913	Klein Curaçao; 11°59′23.3″N 68°38′35.5″W	Fl (2) W 15s.	20 metres (66 ft)	16054	J6399	15
Noordpunt Lighthouse	Image	1913 est.	Watamula; 12°23′02.3″N 69°09′13.7″W	Fl (3) W 15s.	6 metres (20 ft)	15964	J6372	12
Punt Kanon Lighthouse	Image	n/a	Punt Kanon; 12°02′38.6″N 68°44′15.4″W	Fl W 4s.	11 metres (36 ft)	16053	J6396	8
Riffort Lighthouse		n/a	Willemstad; 12°06′17.0″N 68°56′08.3″W	Oc W 5s.	17 metres (56 ft)	16012	J6378	14

== See also ==
- Lists of lighthouses and lightvessels
