= Gorges =

Gorges, the plural of the French word for "throat", usually refers to a canyon.

Gorges may also refer to:

== Places ==
- Gorges, Loire-Atlantique, France
- Gorges, Manche, France
- Gorges, Somme, France
- Cognin-les-Gorges, Isère, France
- Three Gorges, a region in China
- Fort Gorges, a fort in Maine

== People ==
- Gorges family, Anglo-Norman gentry family
- Ferdinando Gorges, founder of the Province of Maine
- Josh Gorges, an NHL ice hockey player
- Thomas Gorges (1536 – 30 March 1610), courtier to Queen Elizabeth I
- Thomas Gorges (Maine governor), deputy governor of colonial 17th century Maine

== See also ==
- Julia Görges (born 1988), German tennis player
- Gorge (disambiguation)
