= Cannon Lake =

Cannon Lake or Lake Cannon may refer to:

== Lakes in the United States ==
- Cannon Lake (Rice County, Minnesota), surface area of 1,593 acres
- Cannon Lake (Goodhue County, Minnesota), a smaller lake 50 miles eastwards
- Cannon Lake, in the list of lakes in Cascade County, Montana
- Lake Cannon, a small circular lake in Florida

== Other uses ==
- Cannon Lake (microprocessor), an Intel processor microarchitecture

== See also ==
- Cannon Creek Lake, a reservoir in Kentucky, US
- Canyon Lake (disambiguation)
