= Qanun =

Qanun or Kanun may refer to:

- Qanun (instrument), a large zither played in and around the Middle East
- Qanun (law), laws promulgated by Muslim sovereigns, in particular the Ottoman Sultans, in contrast to shari'a, the body of law elaborated by Muslim jurists
- Qanun (newspaper), an Iranian newspaper published in London between 1890 and 1898
- Kanun (Albania), the traditional clan law of Albania
- Kanun (Mandaean month), a month of the Mandaean calendar

== See also ==
- Canon (disambiguation)
- Kanon (disambiguation)
- Kanoon (disambiguation)
- Qanuni, surname
- QAnon, a far-right conspiracy theory
