= Lake Canyon =

- Location within Florida
- Location: Lakeland, Florida
- Coordinates: 27.9926°N 81.9433°W
- Type: manmade freshwater lake
- Basin countries: United States
- Max. length: 1,220 feet (370 m)
- Max. width: 200 feet (61 m)
- Surface area: 10.51 acres (4 ha)
- Surface elevation: 125 feet (38 m)

Lake Canyon is shaped somewhat like a lower-case "n." This lake is a manmade freshwater lake in south Lakeland, Florida. It appears to have been a mine excavation that was landscaped to become a lake. This lake has a 10.51-acre (42,500 m^{2}) surface area. Lake Canyon is pretty much surrounded by residences and the dry land that fills in the inside of the "n" has houses on the east side and a very thin strip of vacant land on the other side of the road.

The thin strip of land on the west side of the road mentioned above can be accessed by fishermen along the street public right of way. However, there is no other public access, as there is nowhere the public may swim or launch any kind of boat.
