= Château Canon =

Château Canon may refer to the following notable and smaller wineries:

- Château Canon (Saint-Émilion)
- Château Canon-la-Gaffelière

== See also ==
- Château de Canon, a castle in Normandy
