= 8 cm kanon vz. 30 =

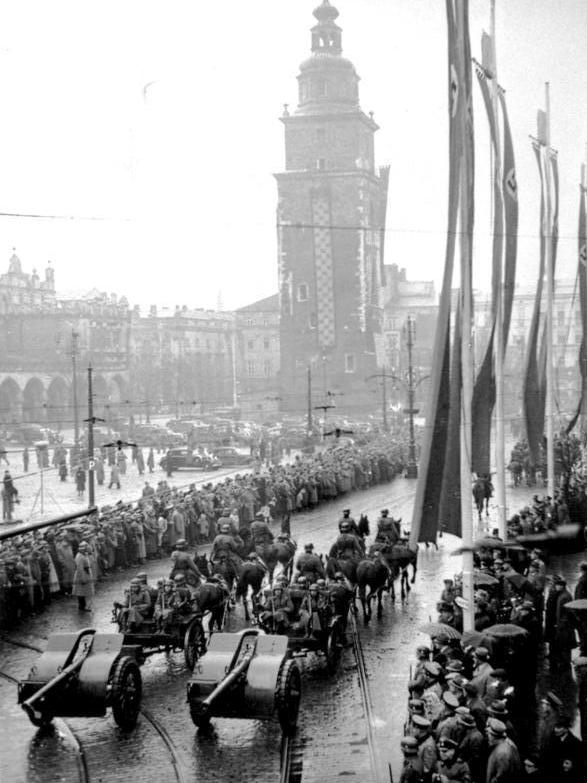
- Parade of SS troops in Krakow, October 1940
- Type: Field gun
- Place of origin: Czechoslovakia

Service history
- In service: 1930–1945
- Used by: Czechoslovakia; Nazi Germany
- Wars: World War II

Production history
- Designer: Škoda Works
- Designed: 1928-1930
- Manufacturer: Škoda Works

Specifications
- Mass: Combat: 1,816 kg (4,004 lb); Travel: 2,977 kg (6,563 lb)
- Barrel length: 3.06 m (10.0 ft) L/40
- Shell: Fixed QF 76.5 x 346mm R
- Shell weight: 8 kg (17 lb 10 oz)
- Caliber: 76.5 mm (3 in)
- Breech: Horizontal sliding wedge
- Recoil: Hydro-pneumatic
- Carriage: Two-wheeled, box trail
- Elevation: -8° to +80°
- Traverse: 8°
- Rate of fire: 10-12 rpm
- Muzzle velocity: 600 m/s (1,968 ft/s)
- Maximum firing range: 13.5 km (8.4 mi)

The 8 cm kanon vz. 30 (Cannon model 30) was a Czech field gun used in World War II. Guns captured after the German invasion of Czechoslovakia in March 1939 were taken into Wehrmacht service as the 8 cm FK 30(t). It was used by a variety of German units during World War II, including I./SS-Artillerie-Abteilung 3 between 1939 and 1940.

== Design & history ==
The origins of the 8 cm kanon vz. 30 began in 1930 at the Škoda Works in Plzeň. It was modified from an earlier Skoda design, the 8 cm kanon vz. 28, which attempted to combine the field, mountain and anti-aircraft roles into one weapon. It proved to be fairly successful at the first two, but was a failure at the third. The Czechs only used the vz. 28 in limited numbers, but exported versions of the gun to Yugoslavia and Romania. The Czechs decided to adopt the vz. 30 to replace their plethora of aged Austro-Hungarian field guns. They deleted the firing platform of the original design and used standard Czech 76.5 mm ammunition. It shared the same carriage that could break down into three pieces for transport a feature also shared by the earlier 10 cm houfnice vz. 28 and the later 10 cm houfnice vz. 30 guns.
