= Punt Kanon =

Lighthouse in Oostpunt, Curaçao

Punt Kanon Lighthouse Oostpunt
- Location: Curaçao, Punt Kanon, Netherlands
- Coordinates: 12°23′39″N 68°44′15″W

Tower
- Foundation: concrete base
- Construction: metal skeletal tower
- Height: 11 m (36 ft)
- Shape: piramydal skeletal tower with balcony and light
- Markings: red lower part and white upper part
- Power source: solar power

Light
- Focal height: 12 m (39 ft)
- Range: 8 nmi (15 km; 9.2 mi)
- Characteristic: Fl W 4s

Punt Kanon is a point at the extreme southeast of the Caribbean island of Curaçao. It lies in Oostpunt, and immediately to the east of a small lagoon. A lighthouse stands on Punt Kanon.

== See also ==
- List of lighthouses in Curaçao
