= Cannon (automobile) =

Defunct American motor vehicle manufacturer

The Cannon was an automobile manufactured in Kalamazoo, Michigan, by the Burtt Manufacturing Company from 1902 to 1906. They made several different tonneau models, with both two- and four-cylinder engines, up to 6.5L displacement.

== See also ==
- Brass Era car
