= 10 cm houfnice vz. 30 =

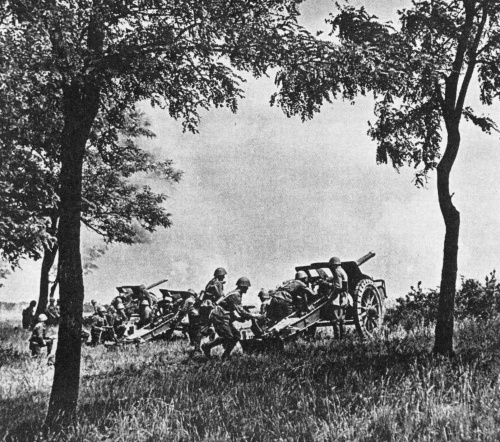
- Type: Howitzer
- Place of origin: Czechoslovakia

Service history
- In service: 1930–1945
- Used by: See users
- Wars: World War II

Production history
- Designer: Škoda
- Designed: 1928–1930
- Manufacturer: Škoda
- Produced: 1932–39

Specifications
- Mass: Combat: 1,766 kg (3,893 lb); Travel: 3,077 kg (6,784 lb)
- Barrel length: 2.5 m (8 ft 2 in) L/25
- Shell weight: 16 kg (35 lb)
- Caliber: 100 mm (3.94 in)
- Carriage: box trail
- Elevation: -8° to +80°
- Traverse: 8°
- Rate of fire: 6–8 rpm
- Muzzle velocity: 430 m/s (1,411 ft/s)
- Maximum firing range: 10.6 km (6.6 mi)

The 10 cm houfnice vz. 30 (howitzer model 30) was a Czechoslovak howitzer used in the Second World War. The 158 weapons captured after the German invasion of Czechoslovakia in March 1939 were taken into Wehrmacht service as the 10 cm leFH 30(t). It was used by a variety of German units during World War II, including II. and III./SS-Artillerie-Abteilung 3 between 1939 and 1940 and SS-Artillerie-Abteilung 51 during 1941. 30 served with the Slovak Army.

== Design and history ==
It was modified from an earlier Skoda design, the 10 cm houfnice vz. 28, that attempted to combine the field and mountain gun roles into one weapon. The Czechoslovak army decided to adopt it to replace their plethora of aged Austro-Hungarian field guns. They replaced the wheels with modern rubber-tired wheels, but curiously chose to retain the crewman's seat on the gun shield. It used the same carriage as the 8 cm kanon vz. 30 that could break down into three pieces for transport. It fired a 16 kilograms (35 lb) shell.

== Users ==
- Czechoslovakia
- Nazi Germany
- Romania
- Slovakia
- Iran
