= Canyon City =

Canyon City, Cañon City, or Canon City (Note: In this context, Canon is pronounced as Cañon.) may refer to:

== Places ==
=== Canada ===
- Canyon City, British Columbia, a settlement now named Gitwinksihlkw
- Canyon City, Yukon, a ghost town

=== United States ===
listed alphabetically by state

- Canyon City, Alaska, a campground along the Chilkoot trail
- Black Canyon City, Arizona, an unincorporated community in Yavapai County
- Canon City, California, a ghost town in Trinity County
- Cañon City, Colorado, (Note: Cañon City in Colorado was spelled as Canon City before 1994.) a home rule municipality in Fremont County
- Canyon City, Oregon, a city in Grant County
- Canyon City, Texas, originally a town in Comal County that now lies at the bottom of Canyon Lake after the dam was constructed between 1958 and 1964. The town was moved and still exists, (not as a ghost town as a previous entry stated, but as a popular vacation town).
- Bryce Canyon City, Utah, a town in Garfield County
- Glen Canyon City, Utah, a town in Kane County now known as Big Water

== Film ==
- Canon City, an American crime film from 1948
- Canyon City, an American western from 1943
- Man from Canyon City, a 1965 Spanish-Italian film

== See also ==
- Cannon City, Minnesota, in Rice County
