= Cannon Island (Alaska) =

Island in Alaska, United States

Coordinates: 57°02′36″N 135°18′01″W

Cannon Island is a small island in Sitka, Alaska, United States. It is connected to Baranof Island and Sitka by a gravel causeway, Cannon Island Drive. The island was named "Pushki" (Russian for cannon) by explorer Ivan Vasilyev in 1809.

Islands near Cannon Island are Minett Islet, Dove Island, Ring Island and Guertin Island.
