= The Gorge =

The Gorge can refer to the following:

- The Columbia River Gorge, a section of the Columbia River in Washington and Oregon
- The Gorge Amphitheatre, a concert venue in George, Washington, United States of America
  - The Gorge (album), a live album by the Dave Matthews Band from The Gorge Amphitheatre
  - Live at the Gorge 05/06, a live box set by Pearl Jam from The Gorge Amphitheatre
- The Gorge, a geological feature of Federated Women's Club State Forest in Massachusetts, United States of America
- The Gorge, Shropshire, a civil parish in Shropshire, England
- Cataract Gorge, a river gorge located in Launceston, Tasmania, Australia
- Vikos Gorge, Pindus Mountains, Greece
- The Gorge and Gorge Water, part of the inner reaches of Victoria Harbour, British Columbia
- A 1968 television play by Peter Nichols, in the BBC's Wednesday Play series
- The Gorge (film), a 2025 American science fiction horror action film

== See also ==
- Canyon
- Thalweg
