= Cannon Creek Lake =

- Location within Kentucky Location within the United States
- Location: Bell County, Kentucky
- Coordinates: 36°40′51″N 83°42′12″W
- Type: Reservoir
- Basin countries: United States
- Surface area: 243 acres (98 ha)
- Surface elevation: 1,283 ft (391 m)

Cannon Creek Lake is a 243-acre (0.98 km^{2}) reservoir in Bell County, Kentucky. It was built in 1972.
