= Murder of Cannon Hinnant =

2020 child murder in Wilson, North Carolina, US

- Murder victim Cannon Hinnant
- Location: Wilson, North Carolina, U.S.
- Date: August 9, 2020; 6 years ago
- Attack type: Child murder by shooting
- Victim: Cannon Blake Hinnant
- Perpetrator: Darius Nathaniel Sessoms
- Motive: Unknown
- Verdict: Pleaded guilty
- Convictions: Sessoms: First-degree murder; Illegal possession of a firearm; Pettit: Felony accessory after the fact
- Sentence: Sessoms: Life imprisonment without the possibility of parole Pettit: 18 months probation
- Convicted: Darius Nathaniel Sessoms; Aolani Takemi Marie Pettit

Cannon Blake Hinnant (April 30, 2015 – August 9, 2020) was a five-year-old American boy from Wilson, North Carolina who was shot and killed on August 9, 2020, while playing in his neighbor's yard. Hinnant's neighbor, Darius Sessoms, was arrested for the shooting within 24 hours.

On December 29, 2022, Sessoms entered an Alford plea. An Alford plea allows a defendant to maintain their innocence while admitting that the prosecution has evidence that would allow them to obtain a conviction. A judge sentenced Sessoms to life in prison without the possibility of parole.

The murder gained further coverage due to prominent conservative figure's claims that the murder was racially motivated, claims which Hinnant's family have repeatedly denounced.

== Shooting and arrest ==
At 5:30 pm on August 9, 2020, Hinnant cycled onto his next-door neighbor's property, and the neighbor, Darius Sessoms, a 25-year-old man, shot the boy at point-blank range. At the time, Hinnant was playing outside with his two older sisters. After police officers and EMS personnel arrived at the location of the shooting, Hinnant was taken to Wilson Medical Center where he died from his injuries. The motive for the shooting is unknown. Sessoms was arrested within 24 hours and subsequently charged with first-degree murder.

On September 22, Sessoms' girlfriend was also arrested in connection with the case. She was charged with felony accessory after the fact.

== Prosecution ==
Sessoms was formally indicted by a grand jury on December 22, 2021. His initial court date was set for January 26, 2022. In January 2022, Sessoms pled not guilty to first-degree murder and illegal possession of a firearm. Prosecutors were seeking the death penalty at that time.

=== Outcome ===
Sessoms was sentenced to life in prison without the possibility of parole on December 29, 2022, after entering an Alford plea. His girlfriend pled guilty to obstruction of justice, and received a suspended sentence of 4 to 14 months, with 18 months supervised probation.

== Political response ==
There were claims circulated by politically conservative social media users and by conservative news outlets that mainstream news outlets other than Fox News were not reporting about the story because they did not want to report about a black man killing a white child. However, according to Snopes, the incident had been covered by local and national media, and there was no evidence of a cover-up.

Conservative social media users also appropriated phrases from the anti-racist policing movement in support of Hinnant. Hinnant's mother posted to Facebook stating that Hinnant's death had nothing to do with race. She also specifically requested that people stop comparing her son's death to the murder of George Floyd. Hinnant's family, including both his mother and father, have repeatedly stated that the murder was not racially motivated.

== Memorials ==
Hinnant's funeral was held on August 13, 2020.

A GoFundMe page was created by Hinnant's grandmother with a goal of raising $5,000 for the family. As of August 19, 2020, it had raised over $815,000.

On August 14, 2020, Skeeter Tulloch of Lee County painted "Cannon's Life Matters" on an unidentified street as a memorial to Hinnant.

On August 23, hundreds of people gathered in Kenly, North Carolina to honor Hinnant. Some at the event wore shirts reading "I Can't Ride / All Lives Matter". An all-day softball event was also held the previous day as a fund-raiser.
