= Cannon Park (Charleston, South Carolina) =

Public park in Charleston, South Carolina

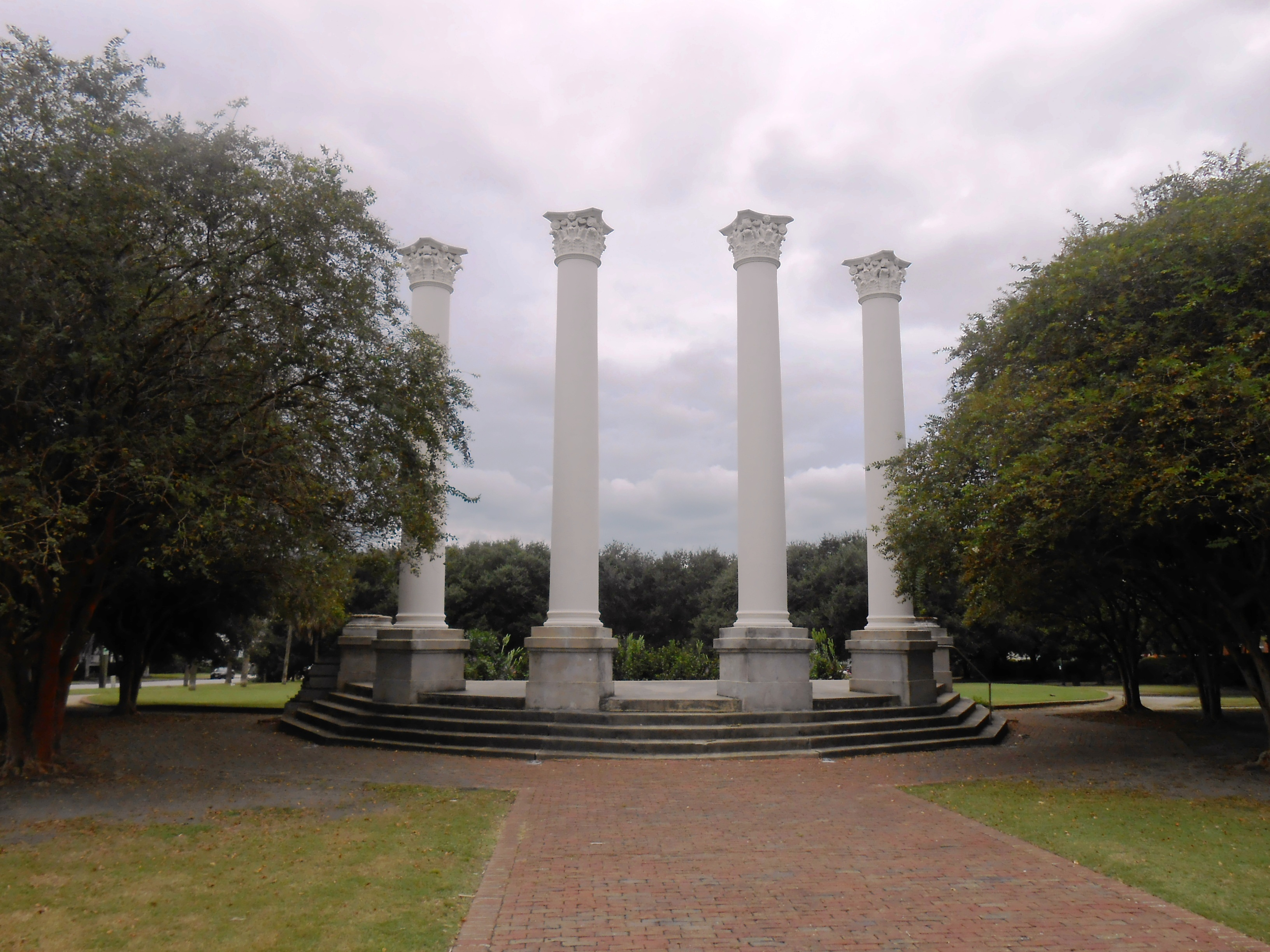
- The columns are all that remain of the old Thomson Auditorium following a fire.
- Interactive map of Cannon Park
- Location: Southwest corner of Calhoun St. and Rutledge Ave.
- Coordinates: 32.7829°N 79.9445°W
- Area: 2.7 acres (1.1 ha)
- Created: 1985
- Operator: City of Charleston Government

Cannon Park is a 2.7 acre public park located in peninsular Charleston, South Carolina. It is bound to the north by Calhoun St. and to the south by Bennett St. To the east and west are Rutledge Ave. and Ashley Ave. respectively.

== History ==
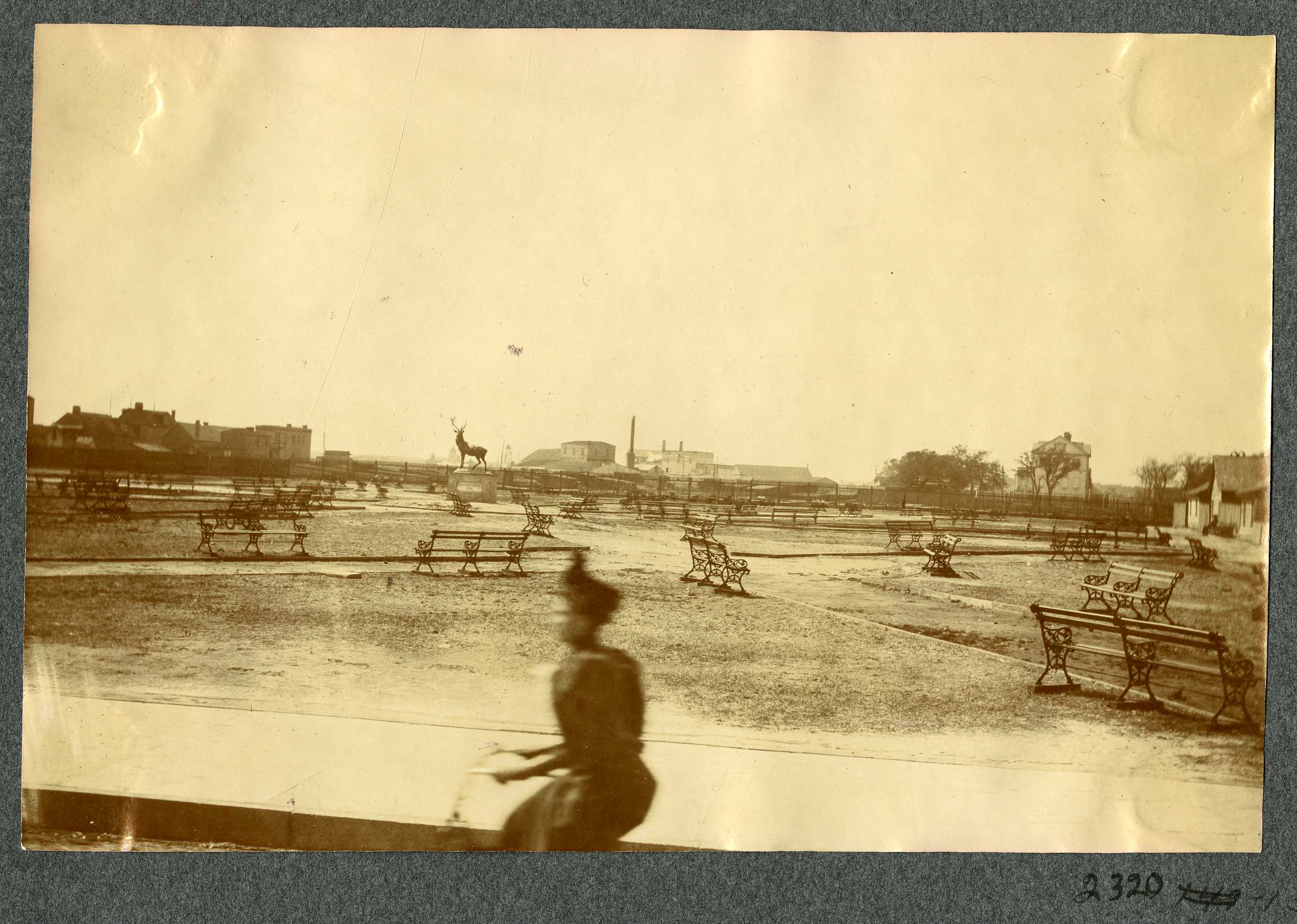
Cannon Park was photographed in about 1896 looking west from Rutledge Avenue. The Gov. Thomas Bennett House can be seen in the background.

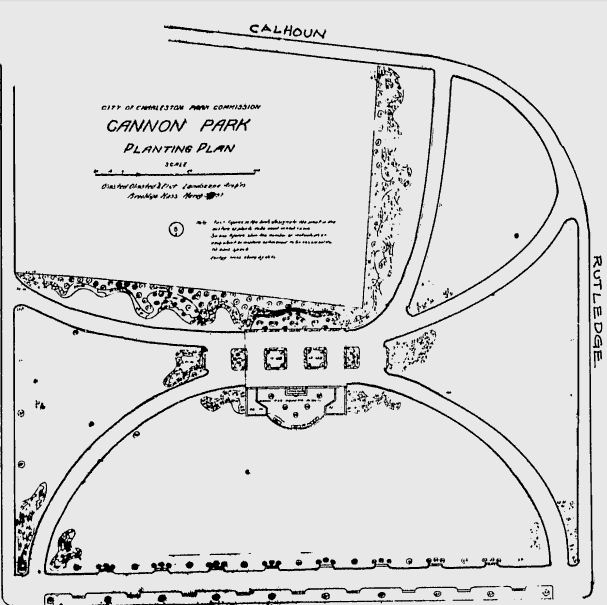
The Olmsted, Olmsted & Eliot firm's plans never were implemented but inspired the layout when Cannon Park was developed more than 80 years later.

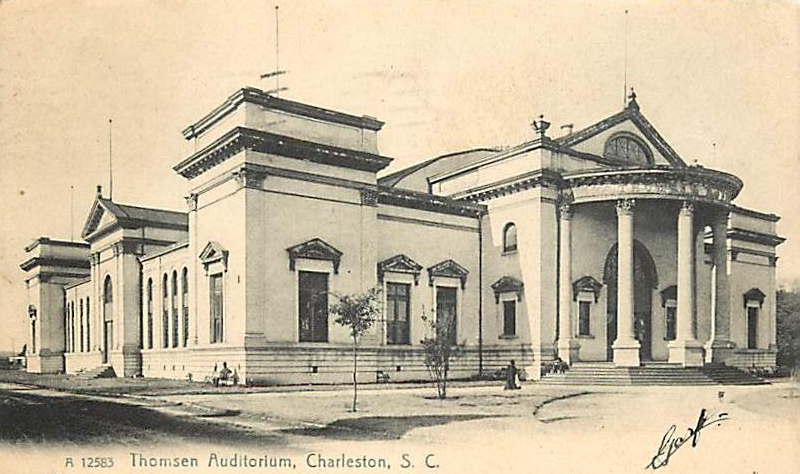
Thomson Auditorium burned in 1981, and only its four columns remain today.

Some of the property on which the park is located was given to the City of Charleston in the early 1800s for a public park. The land previously had been a sawmill pond. The last parcels to complete the existing space were acquired in 1893. Work on a public park began in 1894. By 1897, however, the park had fallen into disuse by residents; goats and cows were pastured on the land, and the grass was left uncut.

In anticipation of a Confederate reunion, Charleston's city council decided to spend $30,000 to build a convention hall. Fifteen plans were submitted for the new facility, and those of Charlotte, North Carolina architect Frank Pierce Milburn were selected. The hall, with seating for 7000, was completed and handed over to the City Council on April 27, 1899. After the Confederate reunion, the hall was used infrequently and never to capacity. In October 1901, the City Parks Commission leased the auditorium to William P. Dowling Jr. for a term of three years for use as a theater. In December 1904, the city council chose to use the building as a temporary location for the city hospital. In January 1907, the city council agreed to lease the hall to the College of Charleston to house its museum, thereafter known as the Charleston Museum, for a nominal rent. In October 1981, a fire destroyed the hall about one year after the museum moved to Meeting Street, leaving only its four grand columns.

In 1981, the city proposed a redevelopment of Cannon Park along the lines of the proposal drafted by Olmsted in the late 19th century. The Olmsted Brothers, a landscaping firm in Brookline, Massachusetts, had designed plans for a park during the 1890s, but these never were implemented before the site became Thomson Auditorium. The proposal retained the columns as a focal point and established the landscape around them using palm trees and oaks. A water basin was planned but never implemented.

The park today has a playground and walking paths. While the park is unfenced, it does allow unleashed dogs.
