= List of museums in Curaçao =

This is a list of museums in Curaçao. There are 30 recognised museums in Curaçao.

- Blue Bay Sculpture Garden — Blue Bay is a sculpture park and open-air museum located in Boca Samí.
- Children's Museum — The Children's Museum is for young children where they can learn by playing. The museum has a hands-on policy.
- Curaçao Museum — The Curaçao Museum contains a large collection of paintings, furniture, glass, and textile.
- Fort Church Museum — The Fort Church Museum is dedicated to the history of the Protestant community and is located inside Fort Amsterdam.
- Jewish Historical Cultural Museum — The Jewish Historical Cultural Museum is dedicated to the history of the Jews in Curaçao and is attached to the Mikvé Israel-Emanuel Synagogue.
- Kas di Pal'i Maishi — Kas di Pal'i Maishi is an open-air museum about the living conditions of the slaves in Barber.
- Kurá Hulanda Museum — The Kurá Hulanda Museum is an anthropological museum which specialises in the Atlantic slave trade.
- Landhuis Bloemhof — Landhuis Bloemhof is an art gallery and museum dedicated to the memory of the sculptor May Henriquez.
- Maritiem Museum Curaçao — The Maritime Museum offers an overview of the maritime history of Curaçao.
- Octagon Museum — The Octagon Museum is housed in the octagon cupola where Simón Bolívar was exiled before he liberated Venezuela from Spanish rule.
- Savonet Museum — The Savonet Museum is located in the plantation house near the entrance to Christoffelpark, and recounts the history of the plantation and its owners and slaves.
- Tula Museum — The Tula Museum is dedicated to the Curaçao Slave Revolt of 1795 and located in the Knip Plantation in Lagún.

== See also ==
- List of museums by country
