= Blue Bay =

Blue Bay may refer to:

- Blue Bay, New South Wales, a suburb of the Central Coast region of New South Wales, Australia
- Blue Bay, Curaçao, a bay of the Caribbean island of Curaçao
- Blue Bay, Taiwan, a bay of the Asian island of Taiwan
- Blue Bay Marine Park, a bay of the African island of Mauritius
