= Ellen Spijkstra =

Dutch ceramic artist and photographer

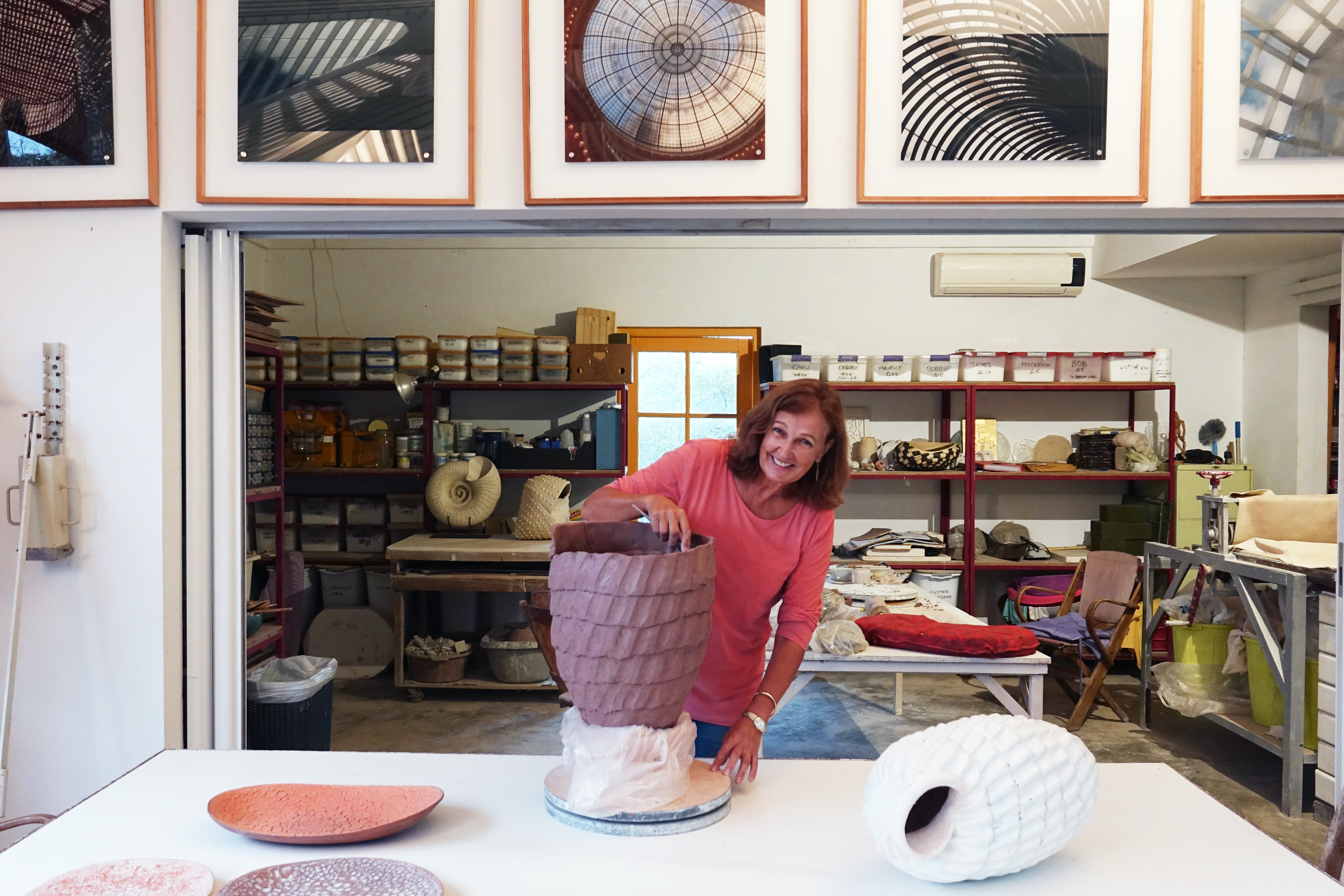
- Ellen Spijkstra in her workshop, 2020
- Born: 3 August 1957 (age 69); Hattem
- Known for: Ceramics

Ellen Spijkstra (born 3 August 1957) is a Dutch ceramic artist and photographer, resident in Curaçao.

== Biography ==
Ellen Spijkstra was educated at the Academie Minerva in Groningen. In 1980 she moved to Curaçao with her husband, Eric de Brabander. In 1985–1986 she took a summer course in glassblowing at the Rochester Institute of Technology in the Rochester, New York metropolitan area, followed by theory courses in clay and glaze studies and kiln construction as part of the Master of Fine Arts Ceramics program. After this year-long hiatus, she settled permanently in Curaçao. She established the ceramics studio Girouette and gave ceramics courses until 2012. Photography was initially only a hobby but after winning a local photography competition in 1985, she developed into a dual talent. In 1991 she completed a photography course at the New York Institute of Photography.

Spijkstra draws much of her inspiration from Curaçao's natural environment. She combines her ceramics with rock and coral fragments and integrates photos of corals in her ceramics. Her main themes are land and water, life and decay. She creates ceramic pieces on a variety of scales, ranging from small to monumental, and prefers to work on series.

Spijkstra has taught at, among others, the Instituto Buena Bista in Curaçao, the Ateliers '89 in Aruba and the Taller Escuela Arte Fuego in Caracas. As an artist-in-residence she worked at the Taller Varadero in Cuba (seventh Havana Biennale), the Resen International Ceramic Colony in Resen and the Shangyu Celadon Modern International Ceramic Center in Shangyu, China.

Spijkstra's work is held, among other museums, in the collection of the Curaçaosch Museum.

She is a member of the International Academy of Ceramics.

== Publications ==
- Global Local: Ellen Spijkstra Ceramics and Photography. Harderwijk: d'jonge Hond, 2008. With texts by Saskia Meijer and Marjan Unger. ISBN 978-90-89100-73-3.

== Solo exhibitions ==
- 1988 Ceramic sculptures and photographs, Het Curaçaosch Museum
- 1989 Ellen Spijkstra, Taller Escuela Arte Fuego, Caracas
- 1993 Lustrum Prijs, Curaçaosch Museum, Curaçao
- 2000 Curaçao Harbor Tour, Maritiem Museum Curaçao
- 2003 Passage of Time, Art Studio Insight, Aruba
- 2004 Waterwerk, Dutch Maritime Museum, Amsterdam
- 2008 Kleurgamma Downtown, Amsterdam
- 2008 Photoimagen, The French Embassy Gallery, Santo Domingo
- 2008 Global Local, Galerie Bloemhof, Curaçao
- 2009 Ellen Spijkstra, Photography and Ceramics, Galerie Taptoe, Brussels
- 2013 Oud en Nieuw, Avila Beach Hotel, Curaçao
- 2015/18 Open Atelier Route, Studio Girouette, Curaçao
- 2019 Ellen Spijkstra – An artistic journey, Het Curaçaosch Museum, Curaçao

== Awards ==
- 1985 First Prize, photo competition 'Inner Wheel', Curaçao
- 1989 Third Prize, international photo competition 'Architecture', New York Institute of Photography, USA
- 1990 Award of Merit, international photo competition 'Romance', New York Institute of Photography, USA
- 1993 Curaçao Museum Lustrum Prize, Curaçao
- 1999 Honorable Mention Arte '99, Curaçao
- 2000 Award final selection, Sixth Taiwan Golden Ceramics Awards Exhibition; the opening exhibition of the new Taipei County Yingko Ceramic Museum, Taiwan
- 2014 Best Work of Art Tile, Elit-Tile 2014/2015, Premio Fundación Susana de Moya, Dominican Republic
- 2015 Honorable Mention, Gyeonggi International Ceramic Biennale 2015, South Korea
- 2023 Cola Debrot Prize

== Ceramics ==
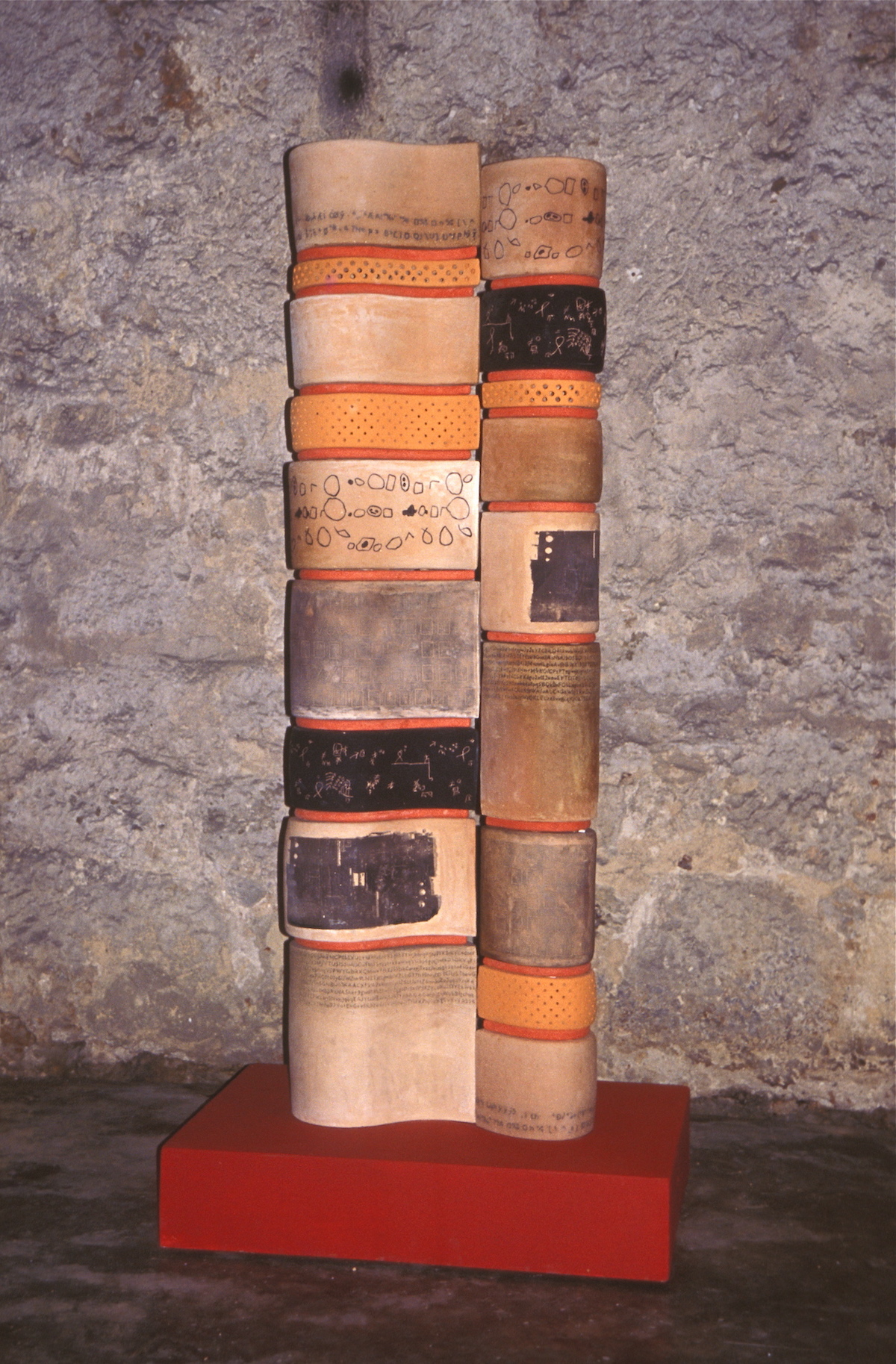
Totem of Confusions (60x30x220 cm), earthenware, underglaze and oxides, 7th biennial of Havana, 2000

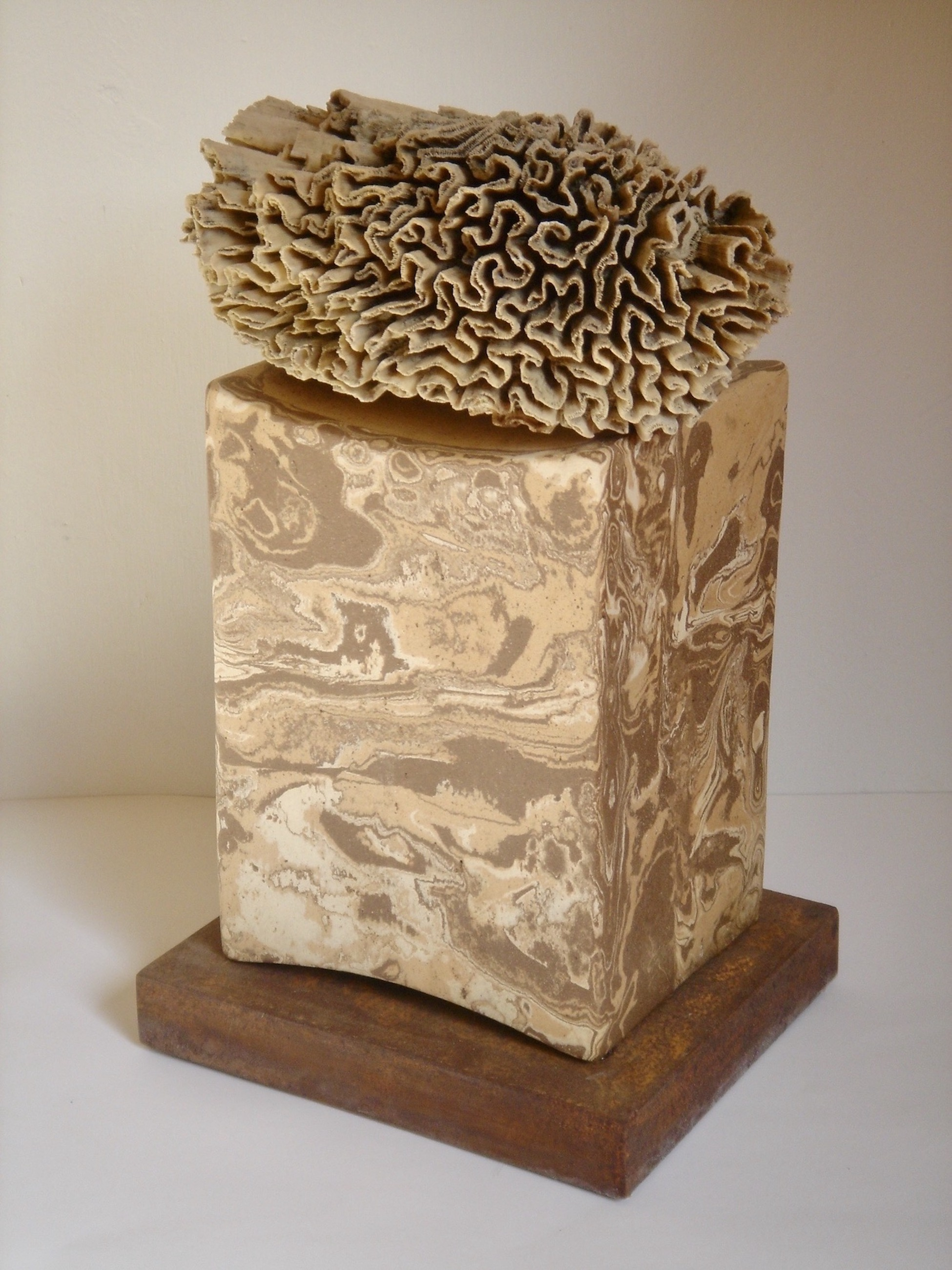
Frozen Turmoil (20x18x30 cm), marbled earthenware, fossil coral and steel, 2004

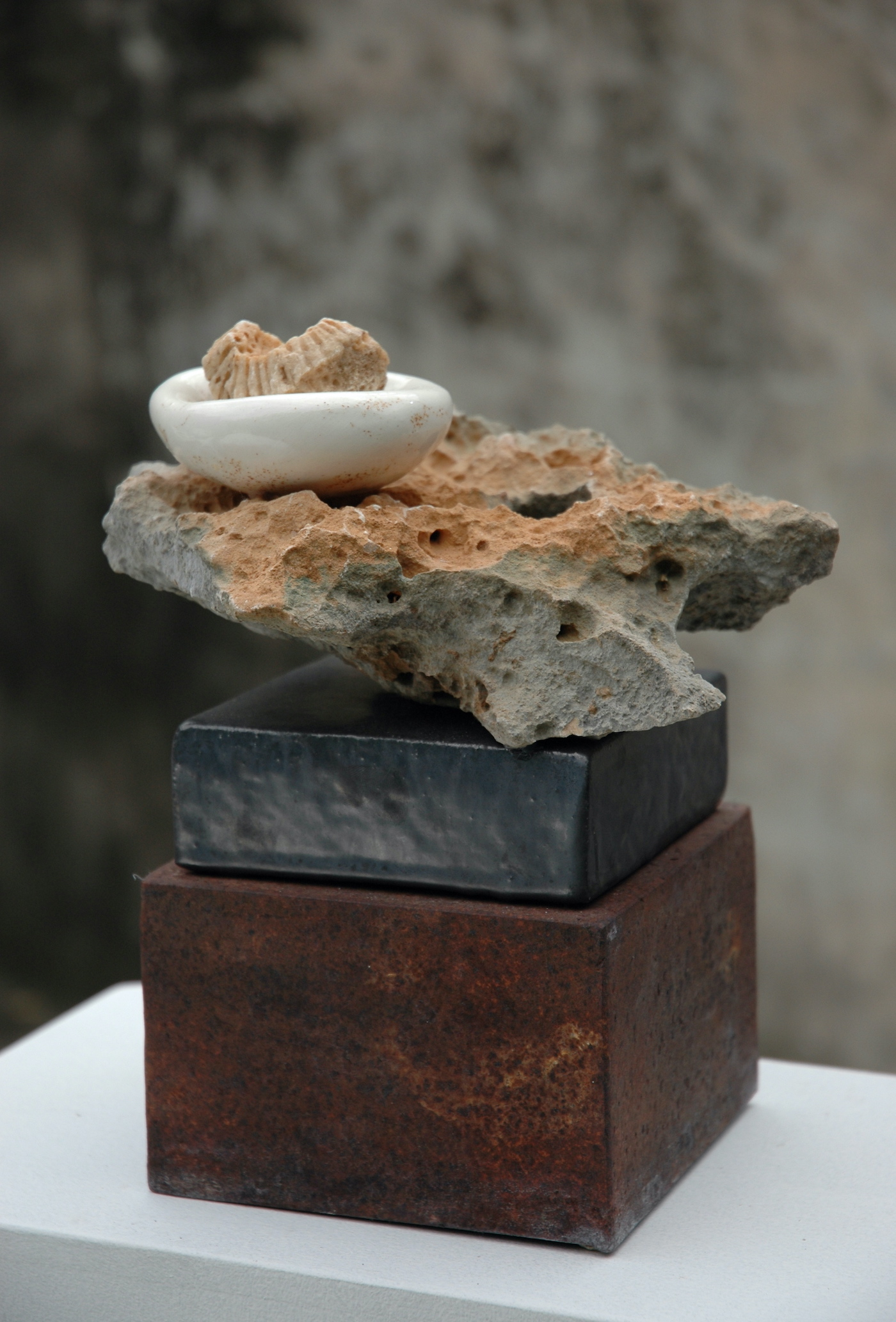
Presenting the Stone V (20x20x30 cm), glazed earthenware, porcelain, fossil limestone, coral stone and steel, 2004

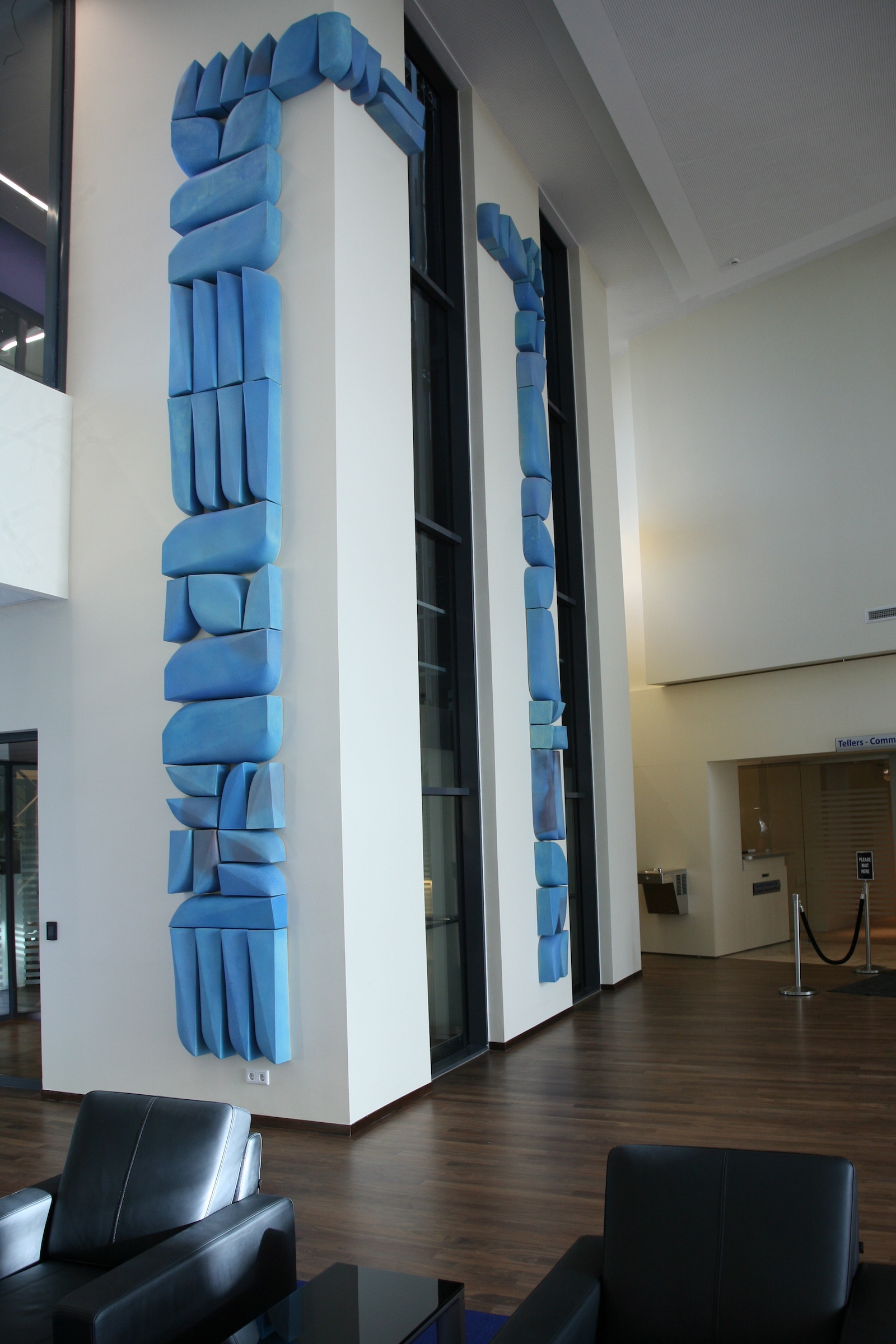
Gateway to a Gateway (650x15x400 cm), glazed stoneware, Maduro & Curiel's Bank, 2011

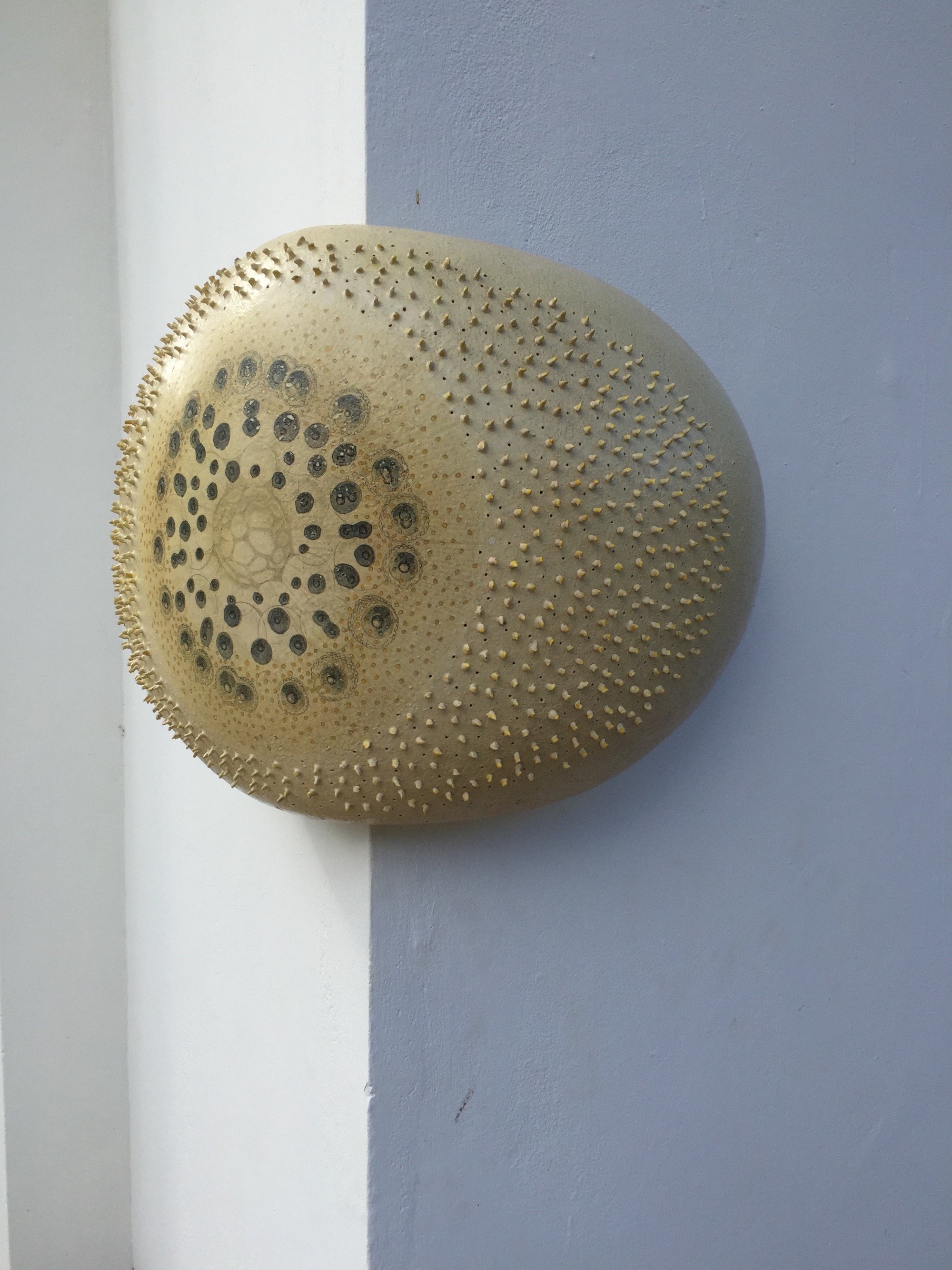
Sea Urchin (38x45x43 cm), glazed stoneware with ceramic decal, 2015

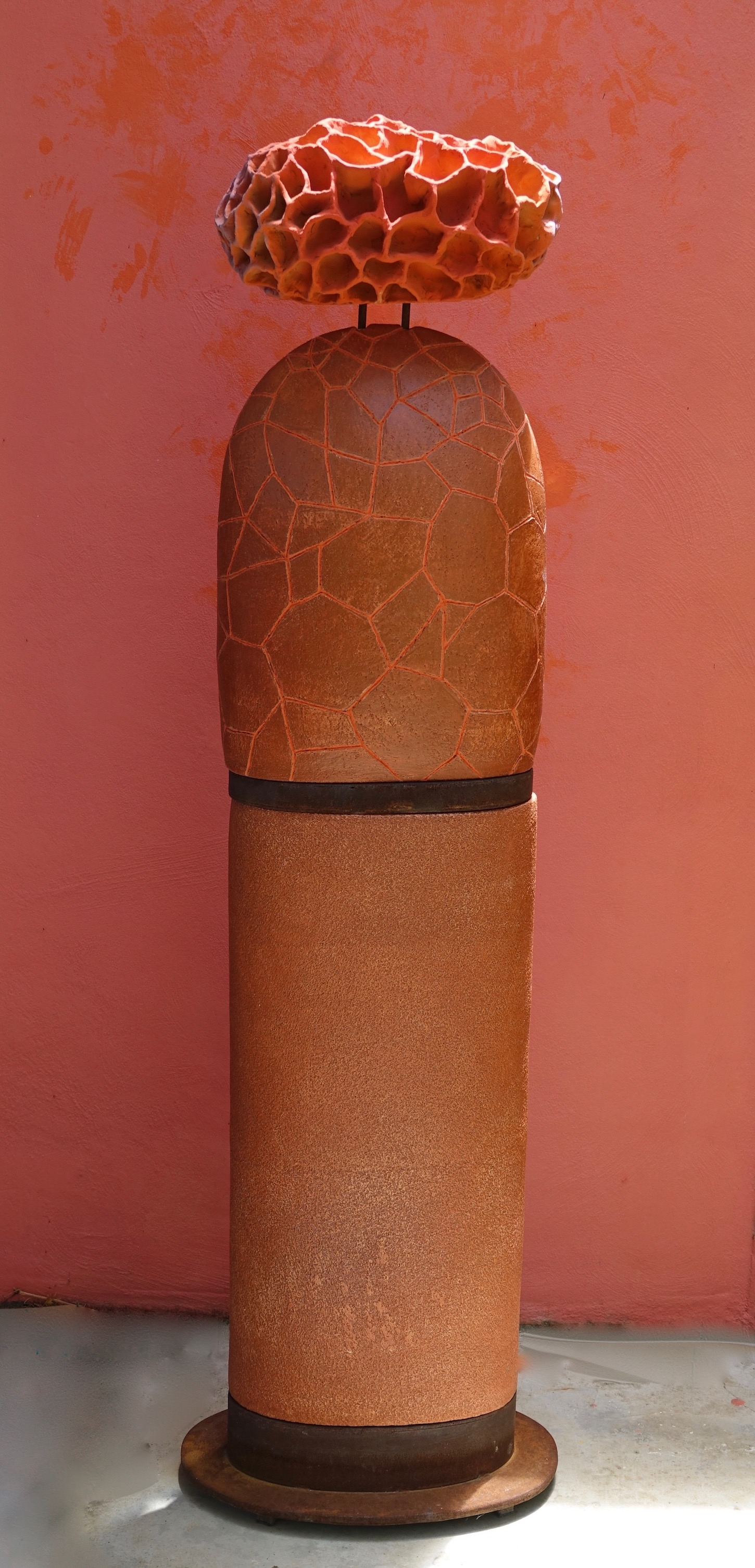
Orange Blossom (43x30x150 cm), stoneware, underglazes, steel, 2019

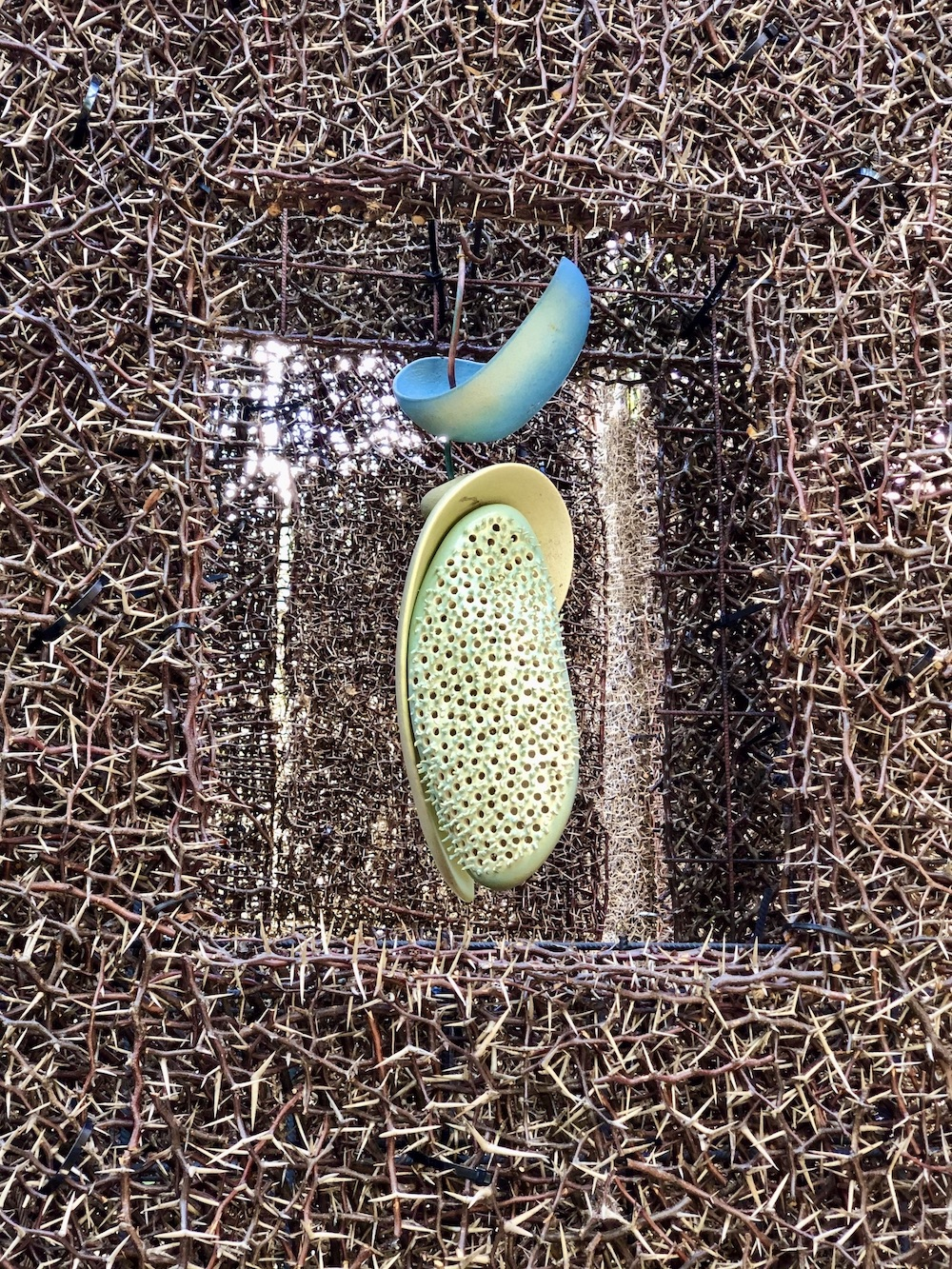
Flor di Sumpiña (20x20x65 cm), glazed stoneware and copper, Cathedral of thorns, 2020

== Photography ==
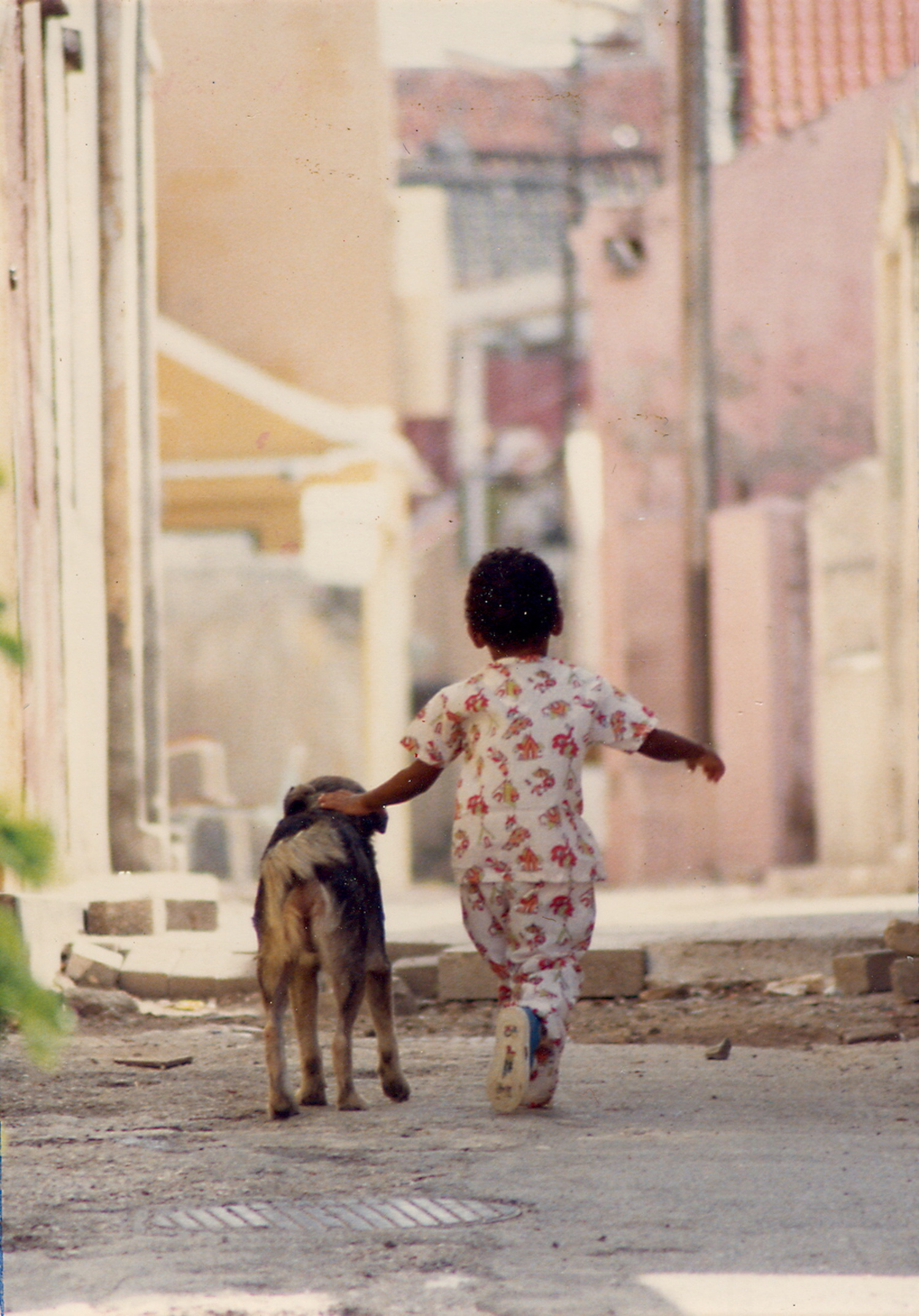
Mi Kacho, 1992

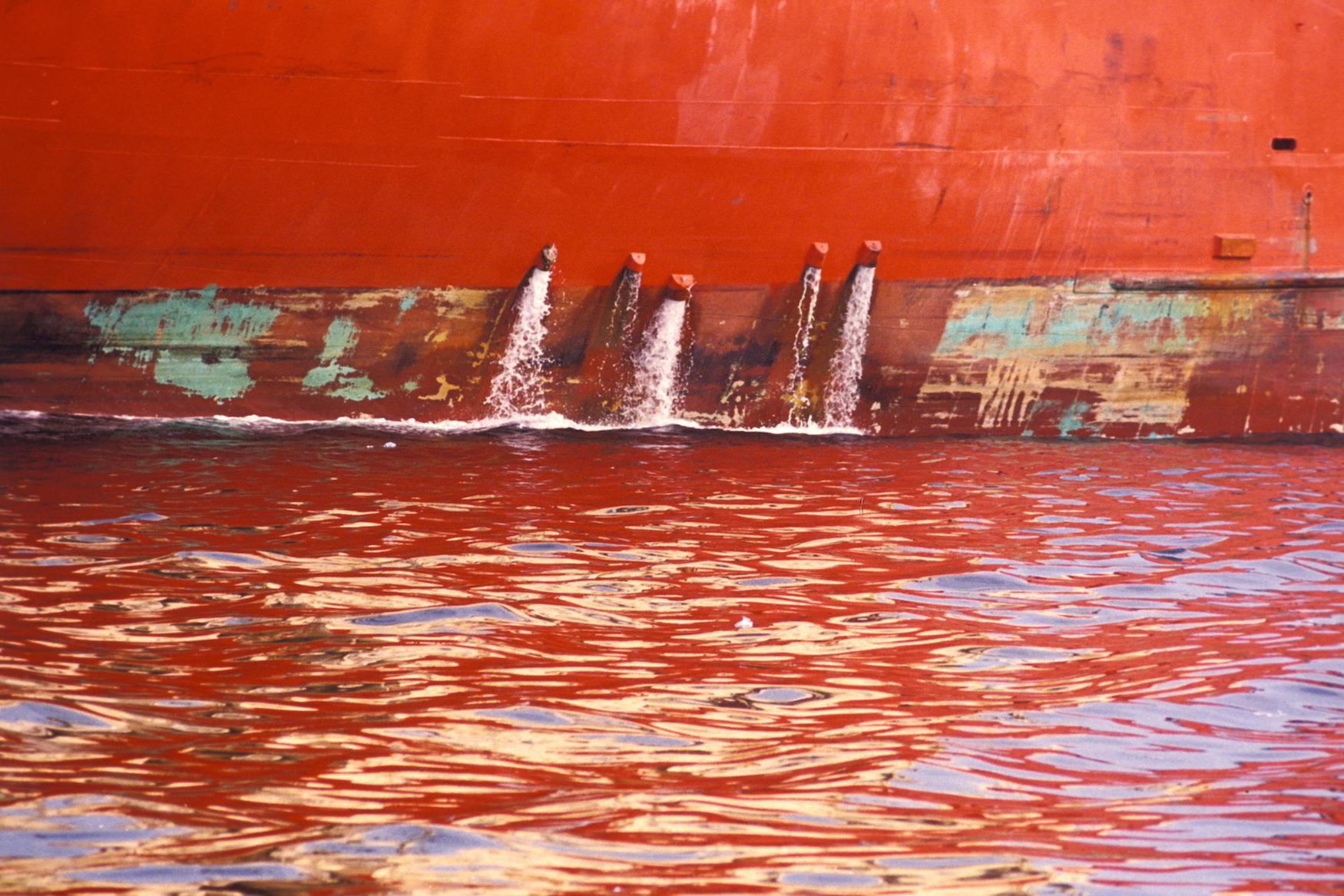
Curaçao Harbor Tour no 1, 1998

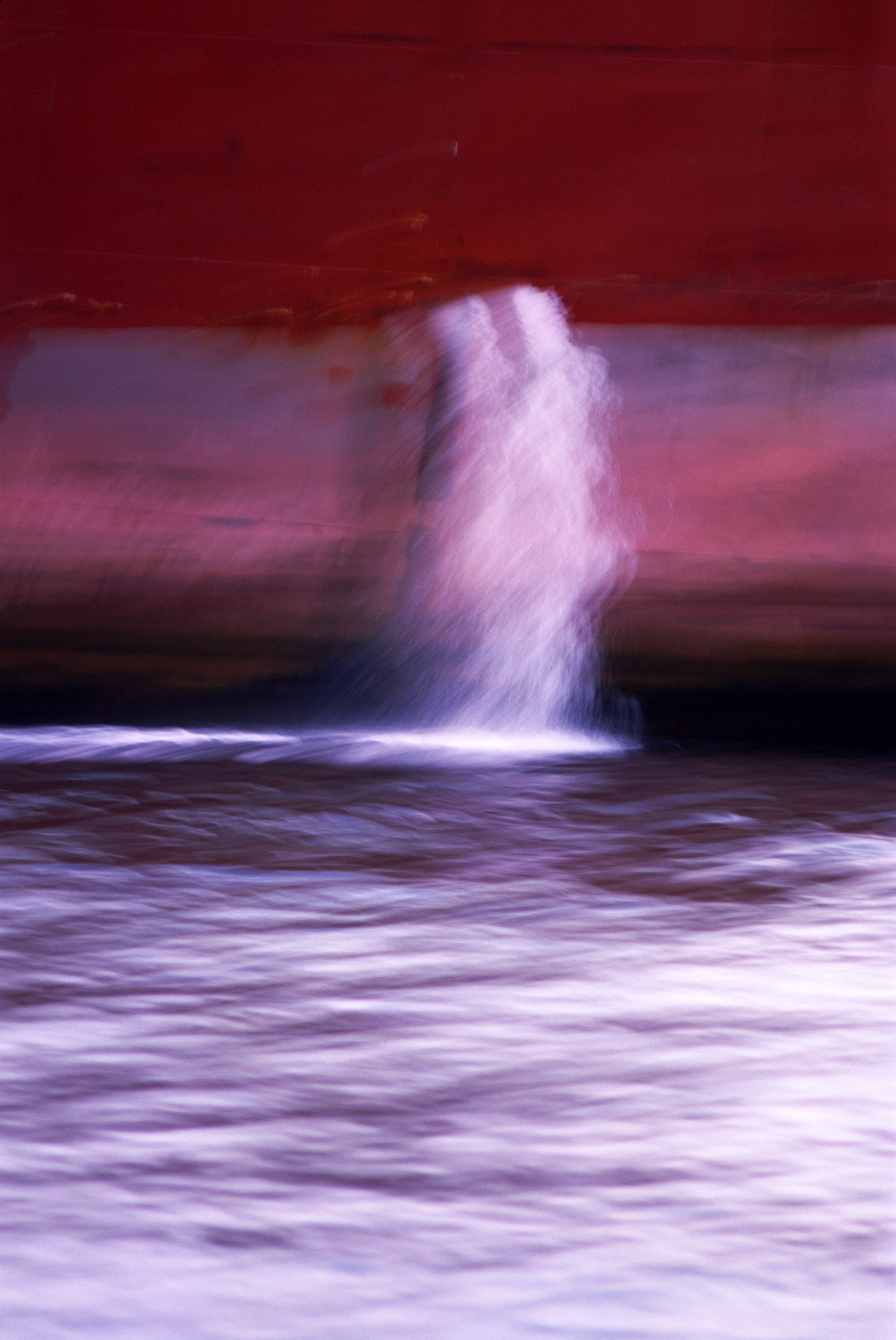
Curaçao Harbor Tour no 33, 2000

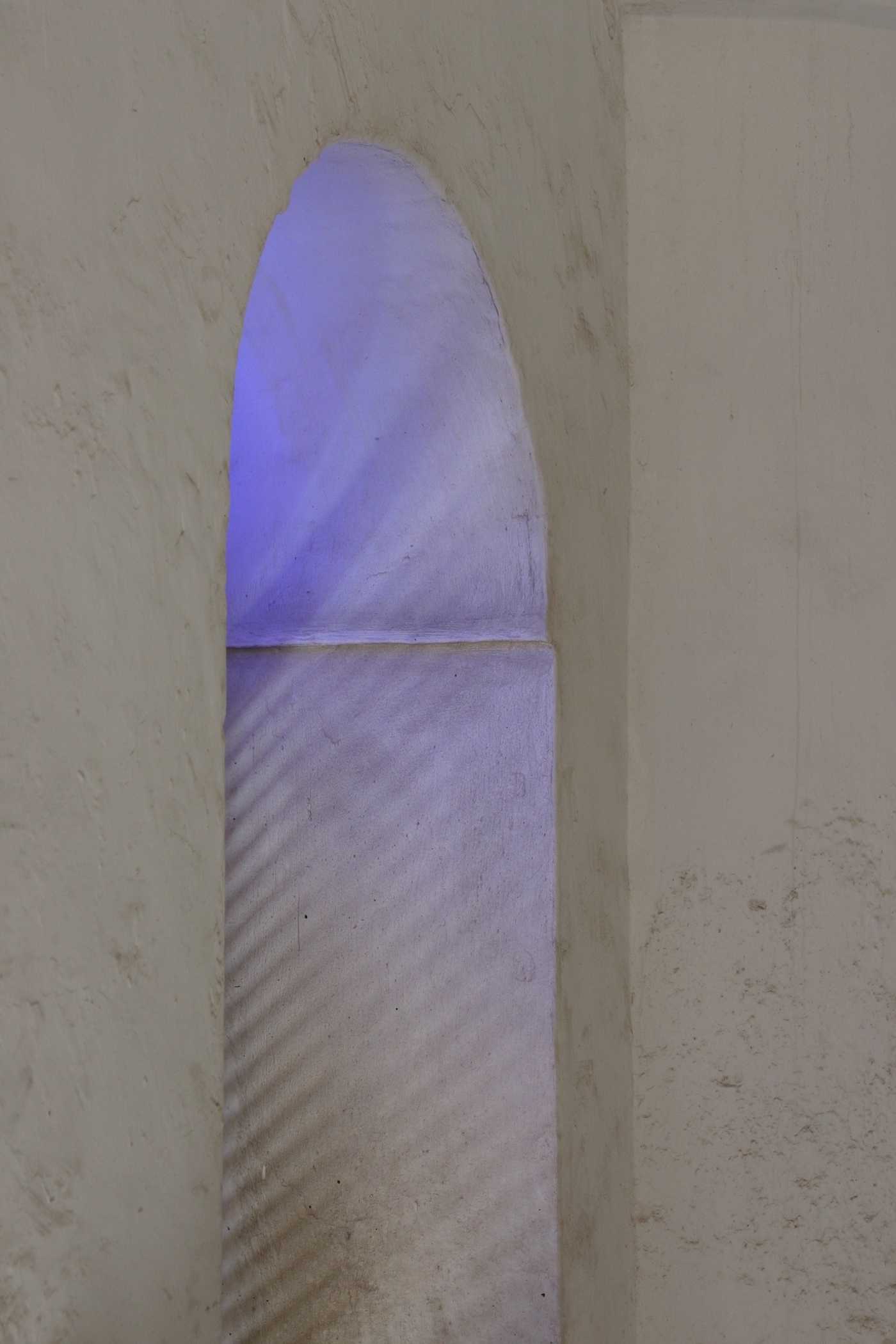
Detail of a 275-year-old synagogue, 2007

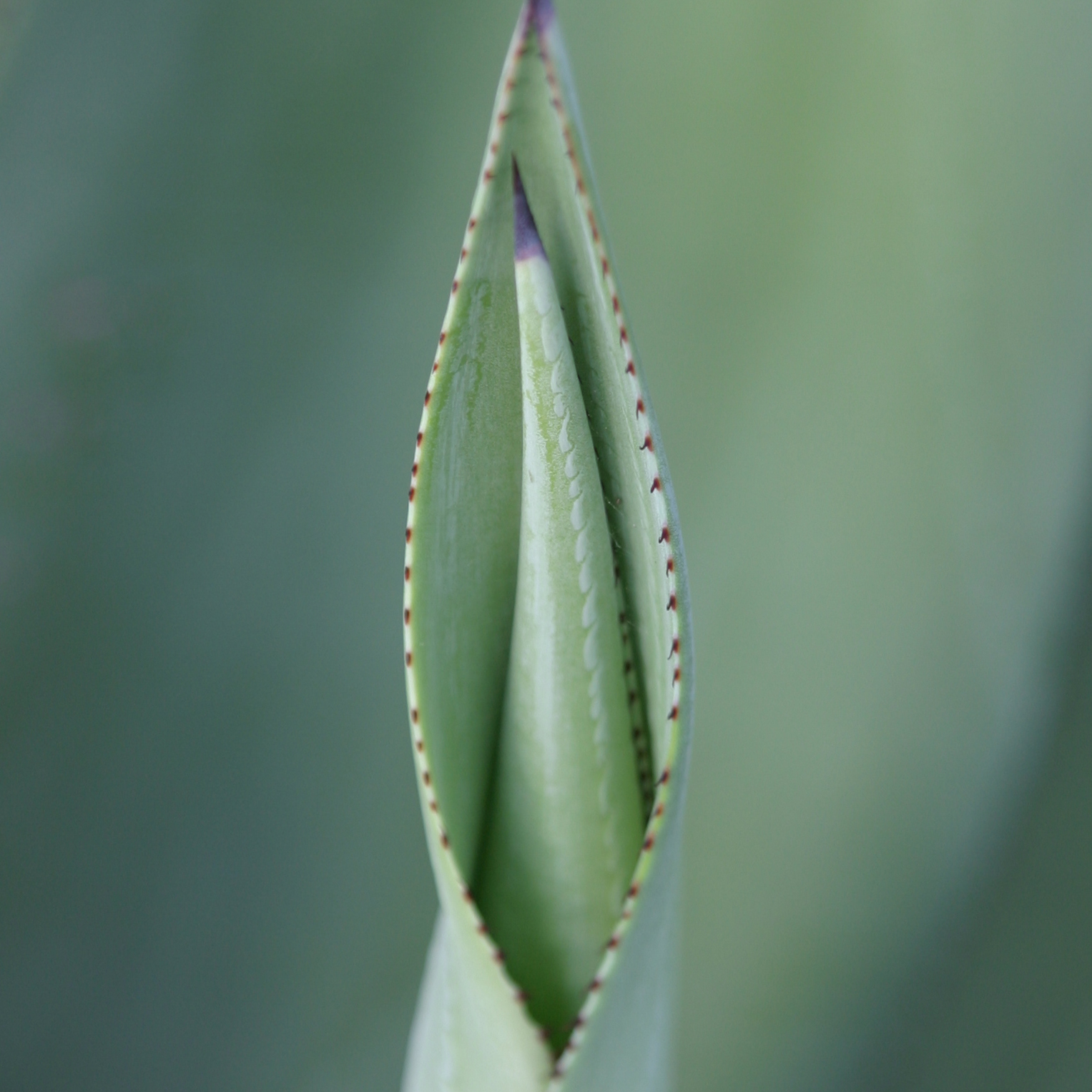
Vagina monologue, 2007

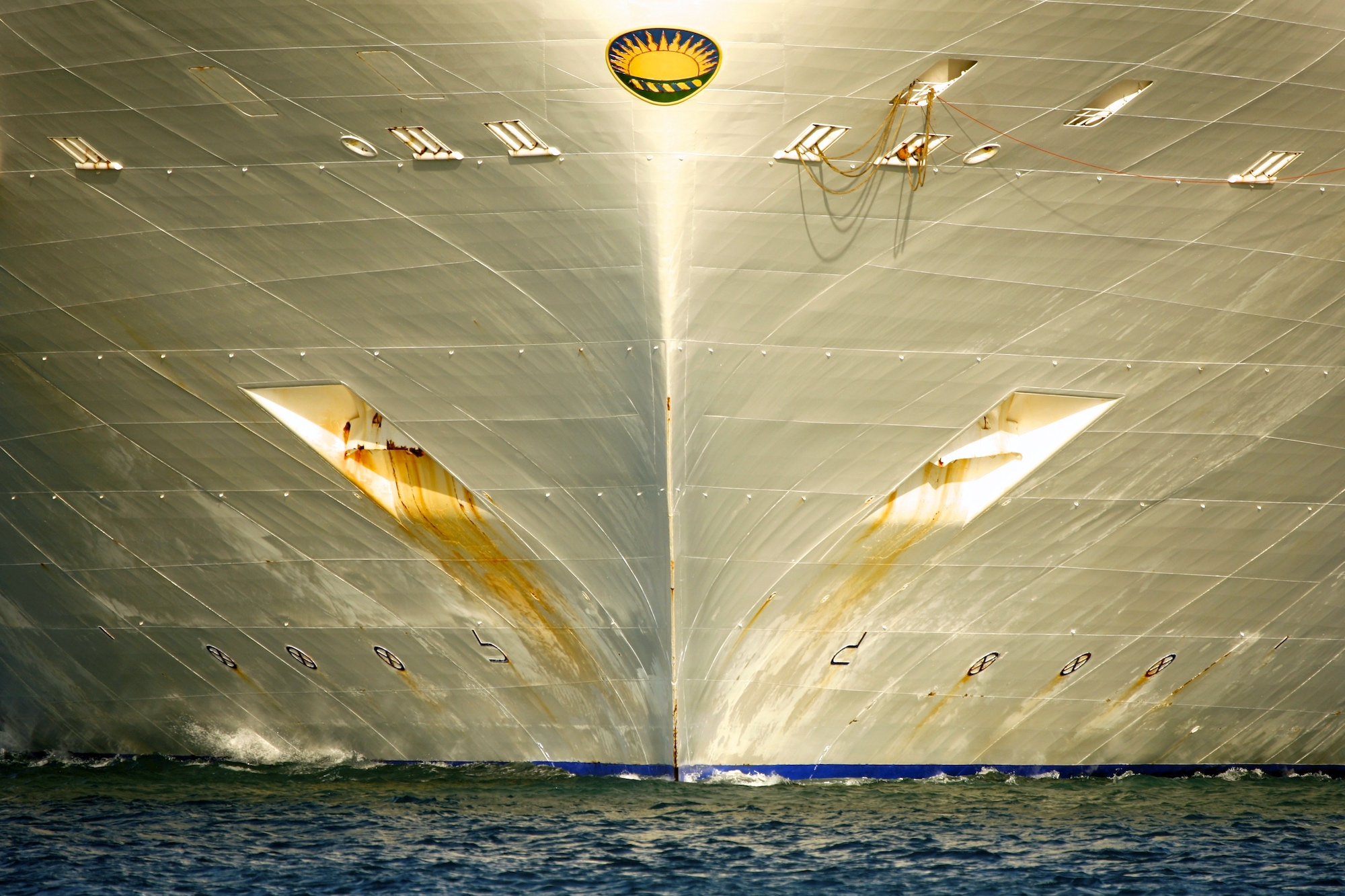
Caribbean Harbor Tour no 16, 2014

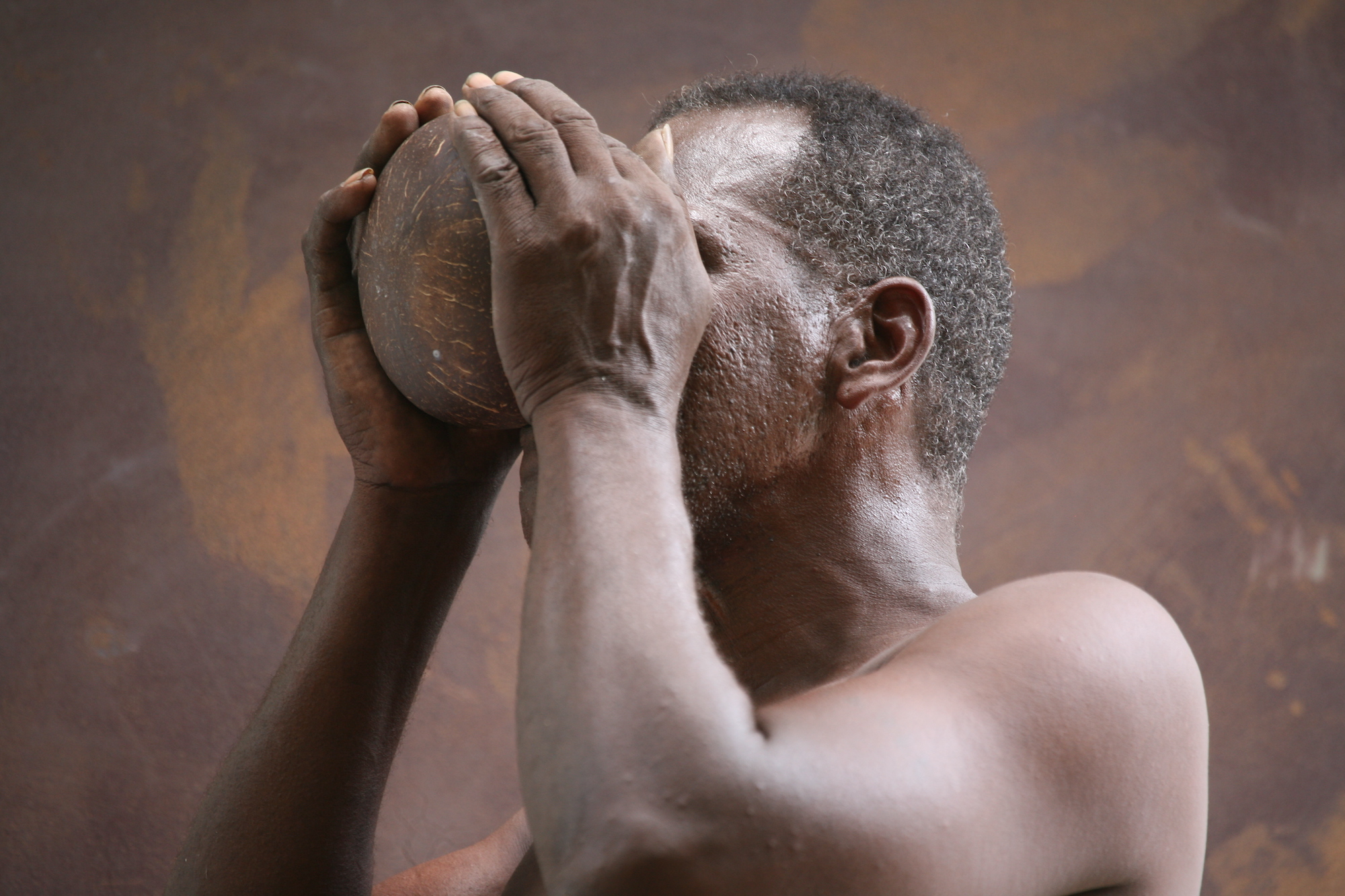
Ritual pa union i forsa, 2017

== General references ==
- Jan Gulmans (2019). Beeldende kunst van Curaçao, Aruba, Bonaire, Saba, Sint Eustatius en Sint Maarten = Visual arts from Curaçao, Aruba, Bonaire, Saba, Sint Eustatius and Sint Maarten: 54 articles from the Antilliaans Dagblad (in Dutch). LM Publishers. pp. 80–83. ISBN 978-94-6022-473-7.
- Jennifer Smit and Felix de Rooy (2012). Curaçao Classics: The visual arts since 1900 (in English and Spanish). KIT Publishers. pp. 136–139. ISBN 978-9460221637.
- Felix de Rooy and Kirk Claes. "Ellen Spijkstra Rust & Coral". YouTube.
