= Blue Bay, Curaçao =

Beach on the Caribbean island of Curaçao

Blue Beach Blauwbaai (Dutch)
- Beach
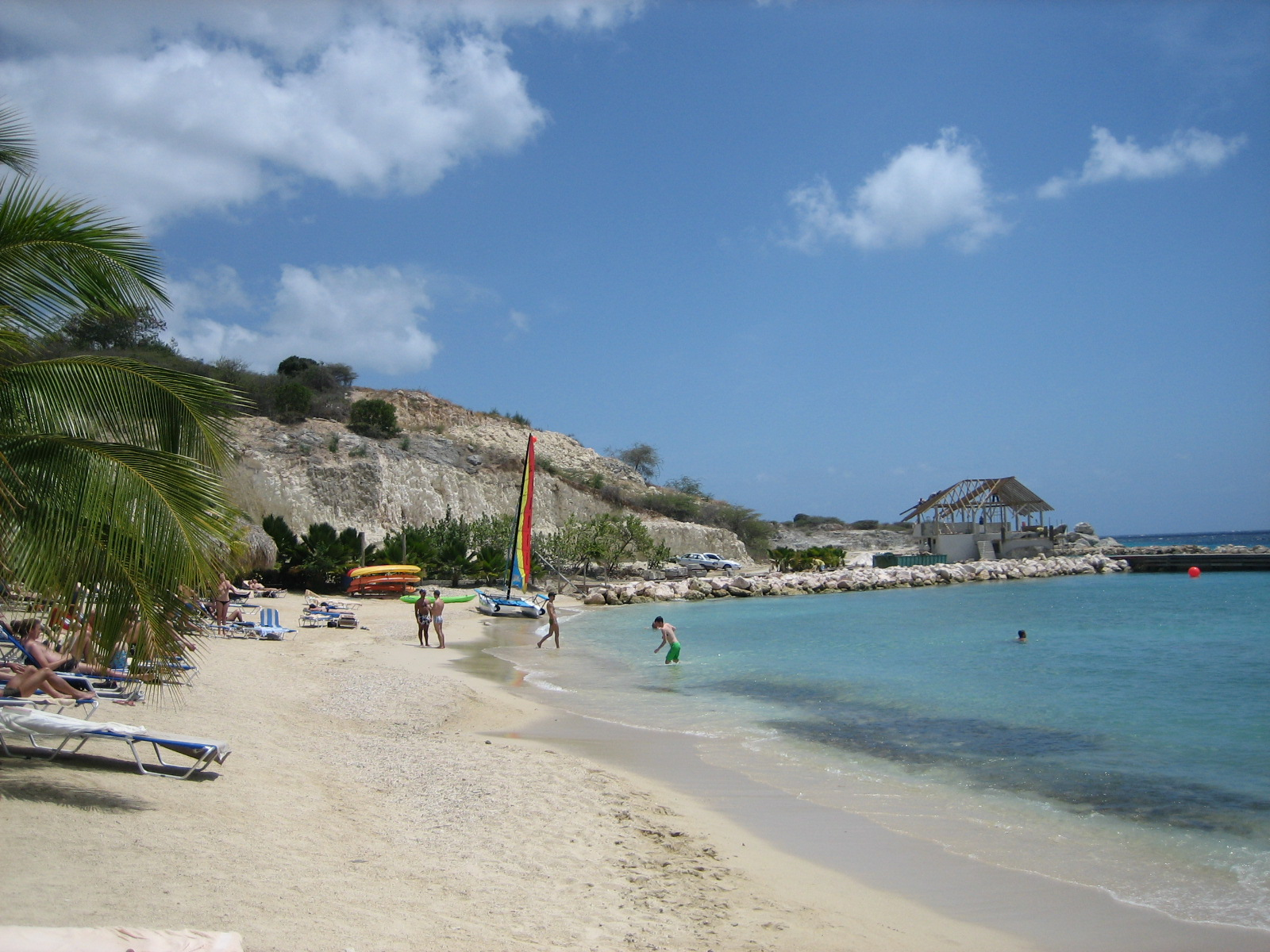
- Blue Bay, March 2007

- Location in Curaçao
- Coordinates: 12°08′04″N 68°59′05″W
- Location: Sint-Michiel, Curaçao

Blue Bay (Dutch: Blauwbaai) is a beach on the Caribbean island of Curaçao, located close to the fishermen's village of Sint-Michiel to the north-west of Willemstad. The beach is named after a plantation "Blaauw" that was located nearby. There are several restaurants at the beach and golf course. The beach is used for snorkeling and diving, because of its crystal-clear water. Nearby you will find a golf course and a hockey pitch. The Blue Bay Sculpture Garden is located nearby in a tourist resort called Blue Bay Curaçao Golf & Beach resort.
