= May Henriquez =

Curaçao writer and sculptor (1915–1999

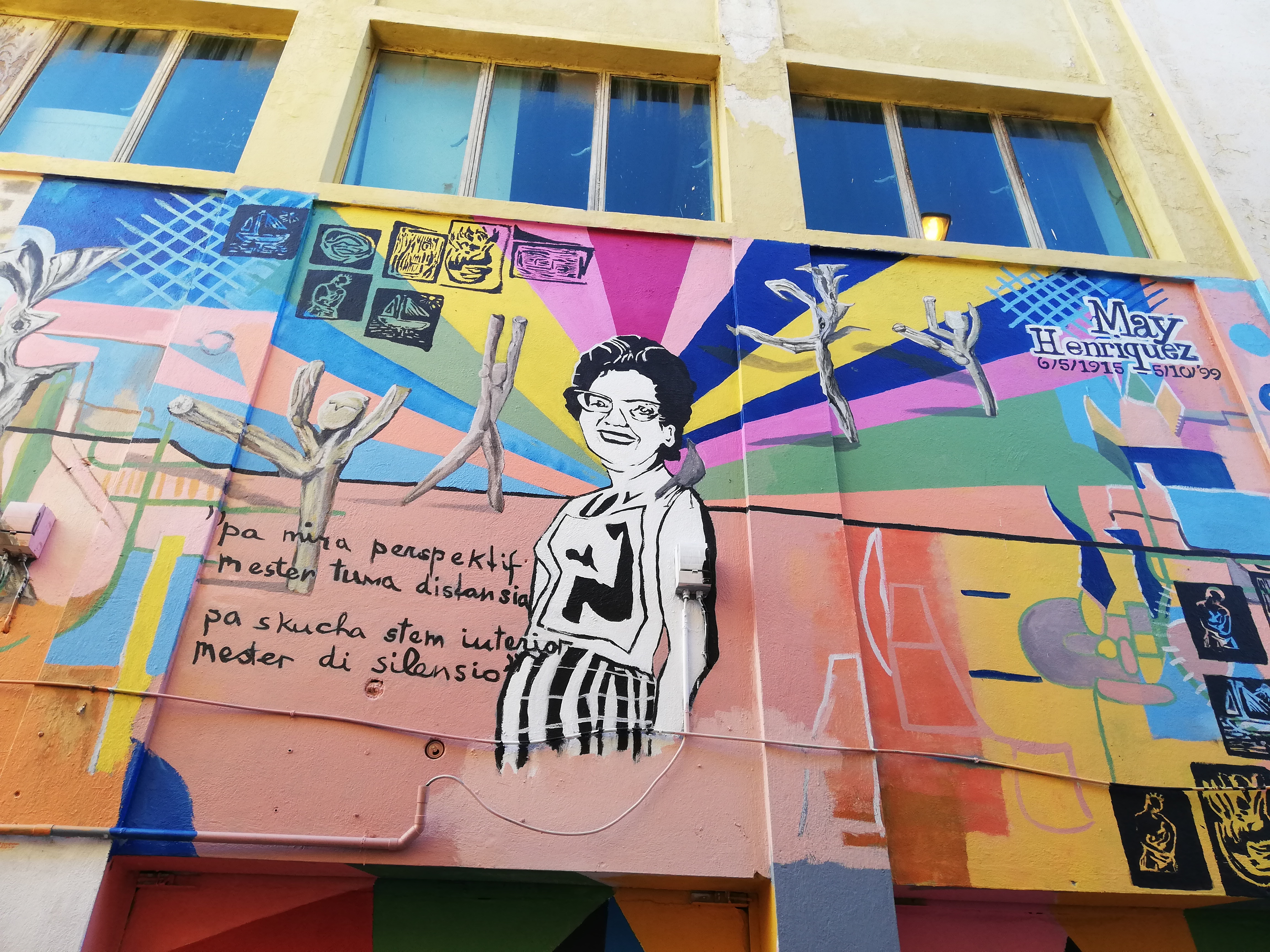
- Wall painting of May Henriquez by Avantia Damberg
- Born: May Alvarez Correa; 6 May 1915; Willemstad, Curaçao
- Died: 15 October 1999 (aged 84); Willemstad, Curaçao
- Occupations: Writer, sculptor
- Notable work: Ami, Dokter? Lubidá! (1953); Yaya ta konta (1981)

May Henriquez (6 May 1915 – 15 October 1999) was a Curaçaoan writer and sculptor. Henriquez wrote and translated works in Papiamentu, the Portuguese-based creole language spoken in Curaçao. She was recognised for her work for the Curaçaoan art community.

== Biography ==
Henriquez was born May Alvarez Correa on 6 May 1915 in Willemstad, Curaçao, in a family of Sephardi merchants. Her father was co-founder of Maduro & Curiel's Bank and her mother was a member of the Maduro family. At home, the language was Papiamentu. After finishing high school, she was privately taught by minister H.E. Eldermans who helped develop her interest for the arts. At the age of 20, she married Max Henriquez, an engineer for Royal Dutch Shell in Venezuela, and they moved to Lagunillas, Venezuela.

During World War II, her husband started to work for Maduro & Curiel's Bank, they returned to Curaçao and took up residence near Landhuis Bloemhof. In 1947, they moved to Caracas for business, where Henriquez enrolled in a sculpturing course with Ernest Maragall. Between 1949 and 1953, she would spend several months a year in Paris at the Académie de la Grande Chaumière, where she was taught by Ossip Zadkine.

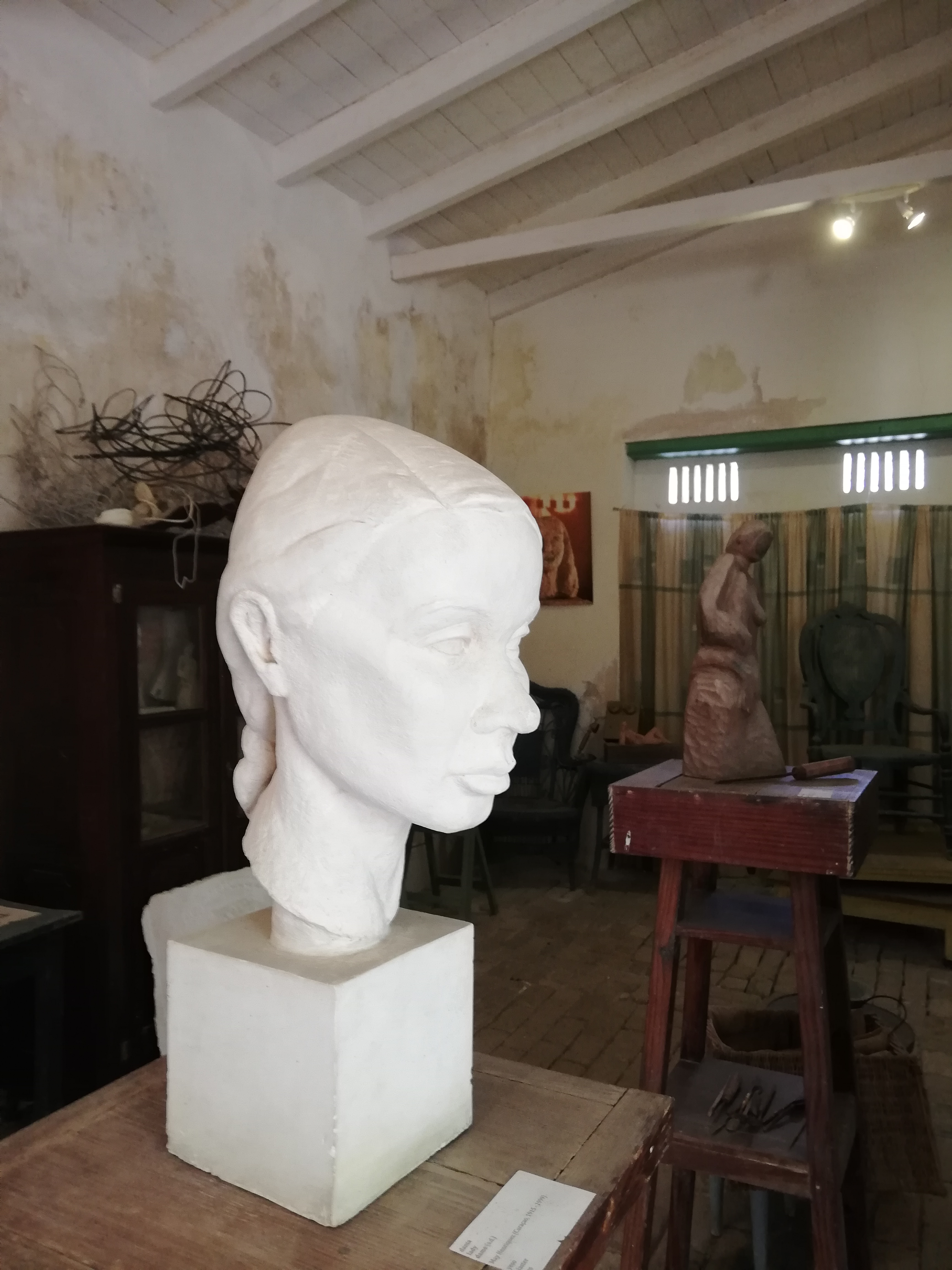
A sculpture by May Henriquez

Henriquez set up a studio in the carriage house of Landhuis Bloemhof. She started to take interest in the Curaçao cultural scene, and in 1950 was co-founder of the Scientific Library which is nowadays part of the University of Curaçao, and became chairperson of the Cultural Advisory Commission of Curaçao. Her estate developed into a meeting place for the art scene attracting artists like Cola Debrot, Corneille and Peter Struycken.

In 1953, Henriquez started translating plays in Papiamentu. The play Ami, Dokter? Lubidá!, a translation of Le Médecin malgré lui by Molière, was successful. This encouraged Henriquez to start translating and adapting more works into Papiamentu. Henriquez was considered a talented sculptor. and remained active until the mid 1970s when she started to focus on writing.

In 1981, Henriquez published Yaya ta konta, a collection of original stories based on the oral traditions of Curaçao. In 1988, she published Ta asina o ta asana?, a study on the influence of the Sephardi Jews on the development of Papiamentu for which she was awarded the Pierre Lauffer Prize.

In 1982, Henriquez started to work for Maduro & Curiel's Bank, and became the chair of the supervisory board of the bank in 1996. In 1985, she was appointed an Officer in the Order of Orange-Nassau. Henriquez died on 15 October 1999, at the age of 84.

== Legacy ==
After her death, Landhuis Bloemhof, the estate where she lived, was turned into a museum and art gallery in her honour. Henriquez had acquired an extensive art collection and library during her lifetime. In 2017, Henriquez became the 12th Outstanding Woman of Curaçao for her work promoting Papiamentu. In the same year, she was also honoured with a postage stamp.

== See also ==
- Landhuis Bloemhof
