= Blue Bay Sculpture Garden =

Sculpture garden in Curaçao

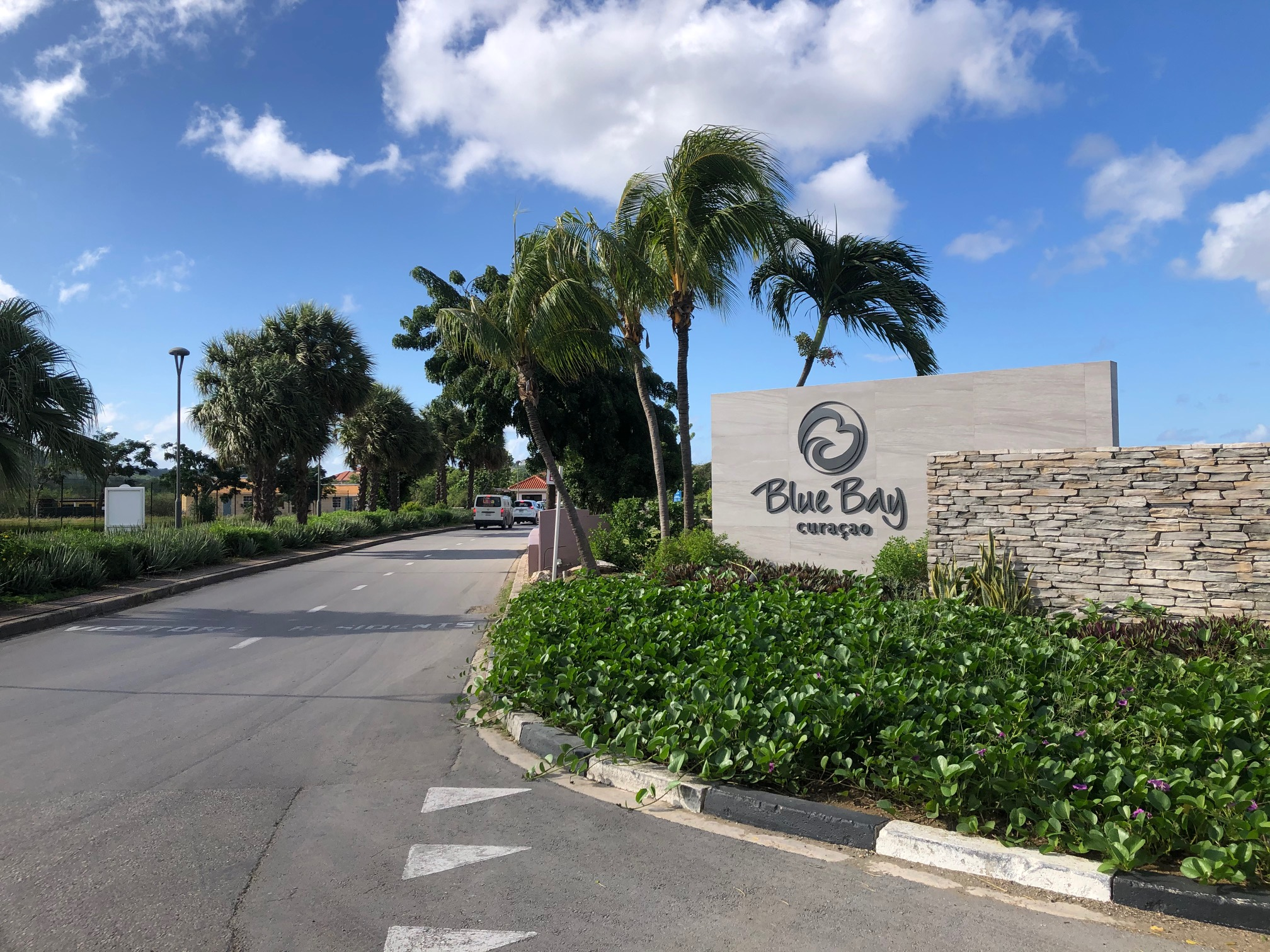
- Entrance to the sculpture garden
- Interactive map of Blue Bay Sculpture Garden
- Type: Sculpture garden
- Location: Boca Samí, Curaçao
- Nearest city: Willemstad
- Created: 2 May 2017

The Blue Bay Sculpture Garden is a sculpture park situated at the Blue Bay Golf & Beach Resort in Boca Samí, Curaçao, on an area of approximately 2000 square metres in front of and next to Landhuis Blauw.

The Blue Bay Sculpture Garden Foundation was established in 2017. The board not only wants to foster tourism with the sculpture park, but also give an impetus to art education in Curaçao.

The piece that was first placed in the park was a ceramic totem by Ellen Spijkstra, followed by works by, among others, Giovanni Abath, Eddy Baetens, Babs de Brabander Sr, Hortence Brouwn, Avantia Damberg, Rien te Hennepe, Nic Jonk, Yubi Kirindongo, Norva Sling, Omar Sling, Gerrit van der Veen and Brigitte Wawoe. In 2022, there are more than 40 sculptures by 29 artists. They are made from a wide variety of local materials and are located along a sculpture trail that starts at the entrance of the resort and ends at the manor house, a former plantation house.

In January 2019 a delegation of museum Beelden aan Zee visited the sculpture garden. The museum will temporarily loan monumental sculptures of international artists to the sculpture garden. In 2021, a second sculpture by Nic Jonk was added, Pacific Song. It represents whales whose tails form a heart.

In november 2021 princess Beatrix of the Netherlands visited the sculpture garden and was shown around by Ellen Spijkstra.

== Selection of exhibited works ==
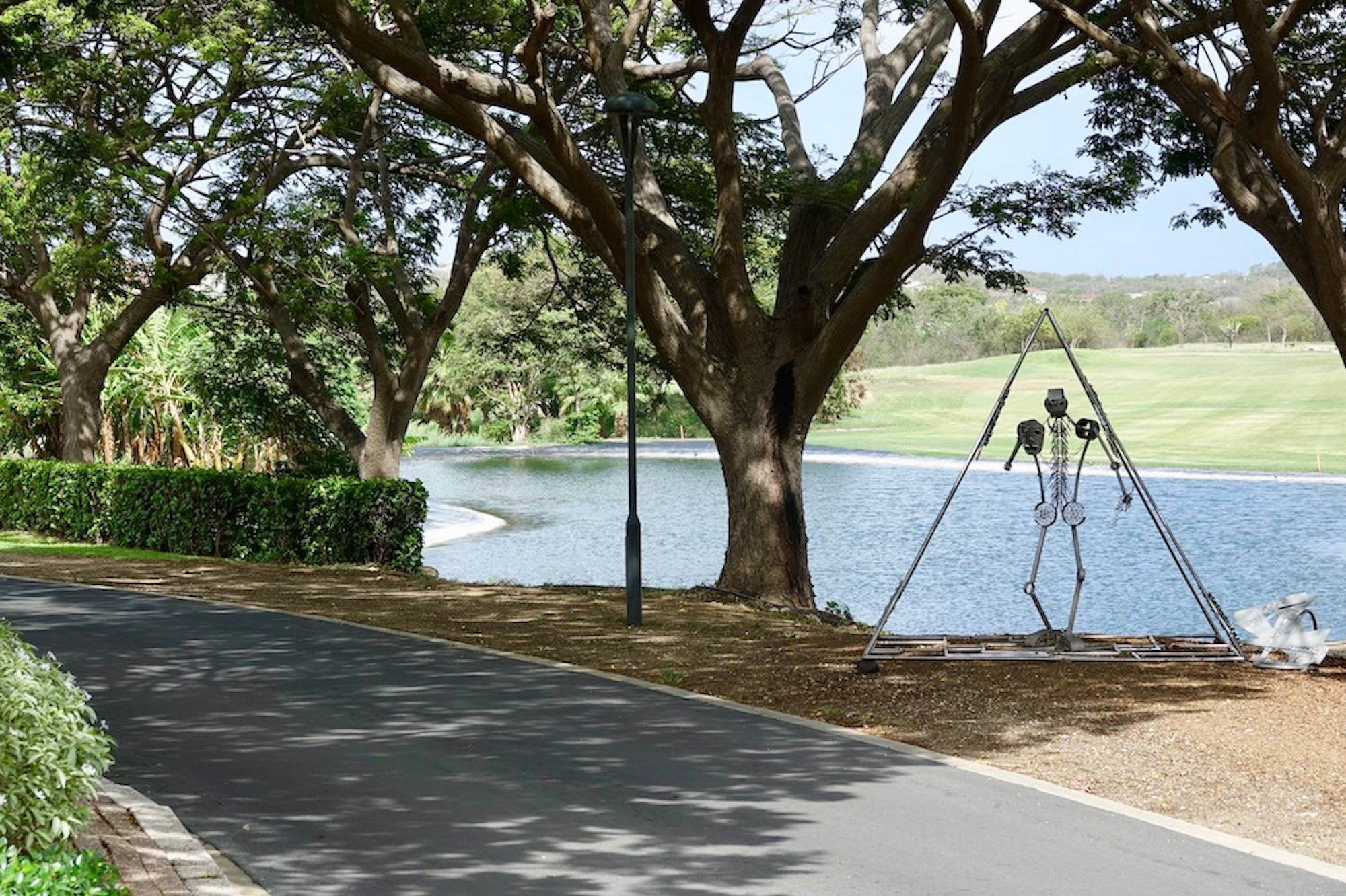
Man of Steel by Giovanni Abath

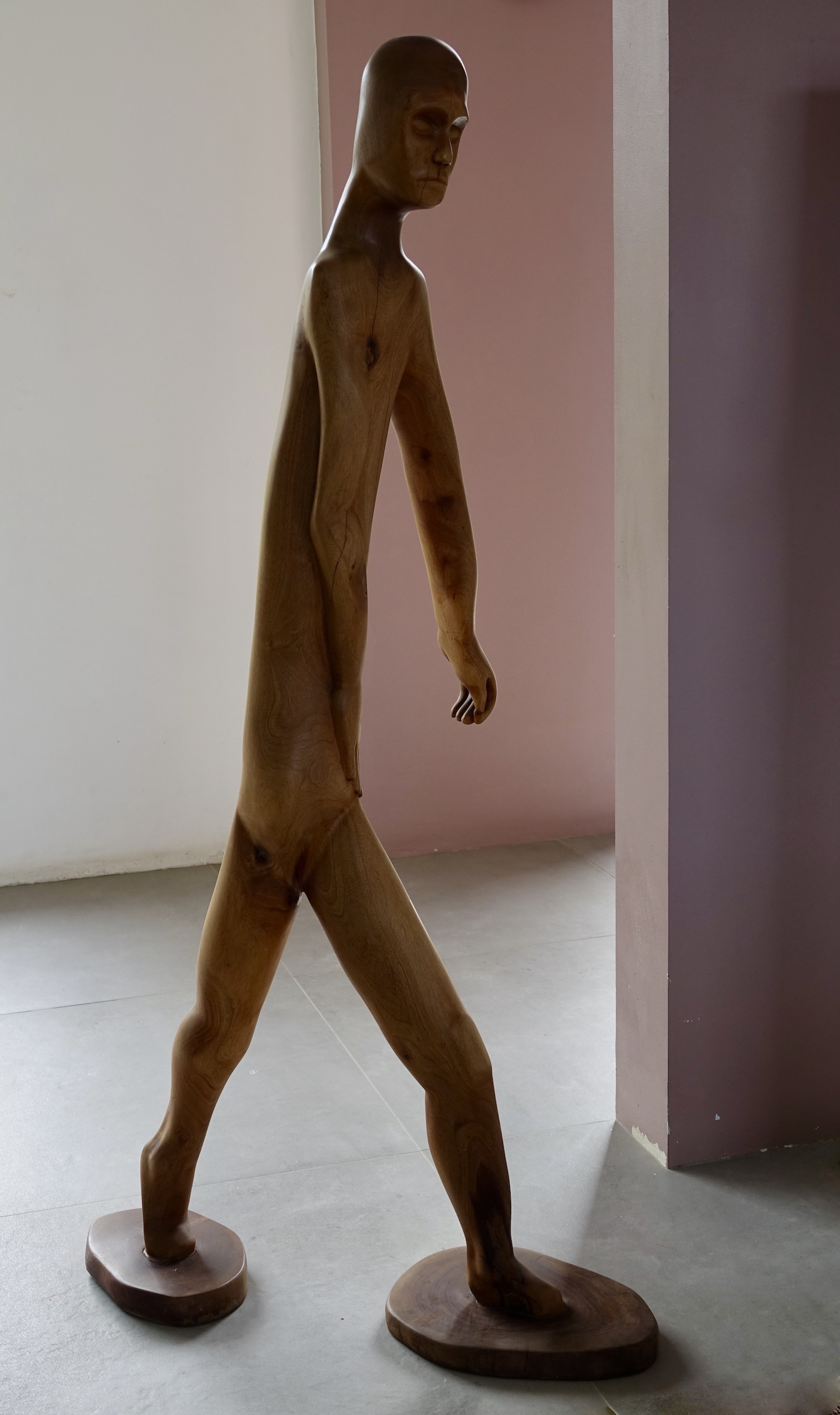
Johnny Walker still going strong by Eddy Baetens

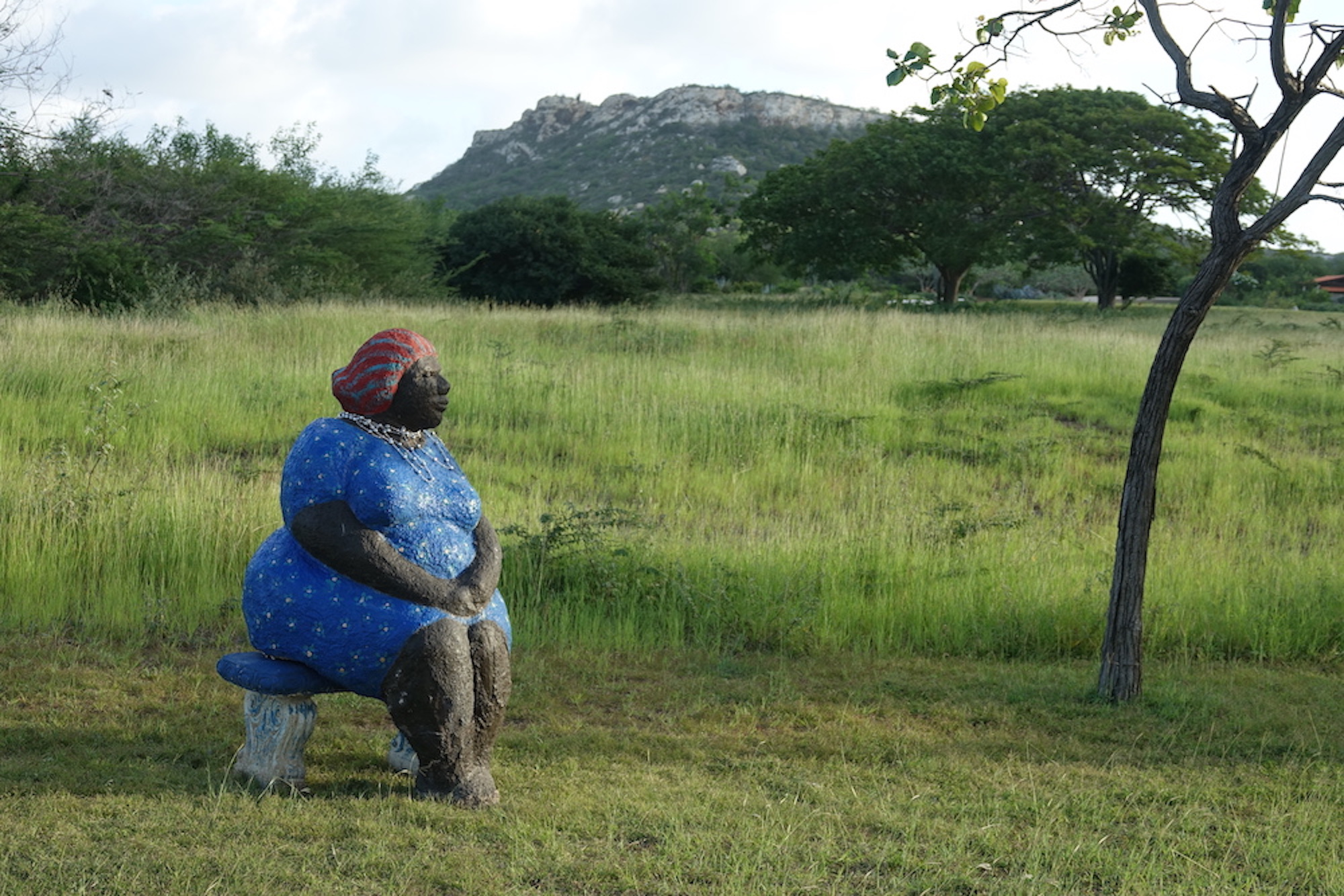
Big Mama by Hortence Brouwn

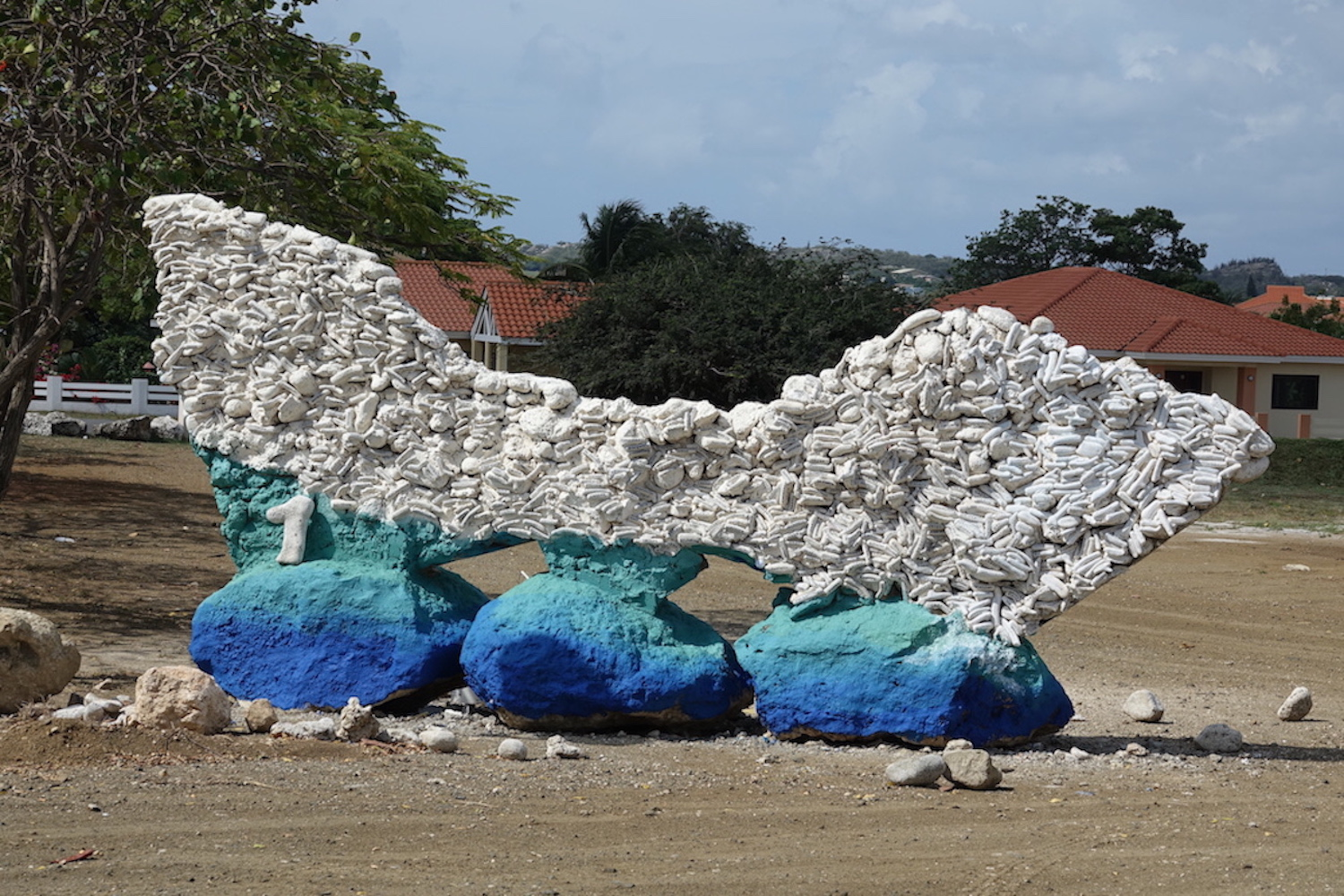
Map of Curaçao III by Avantia Damberg

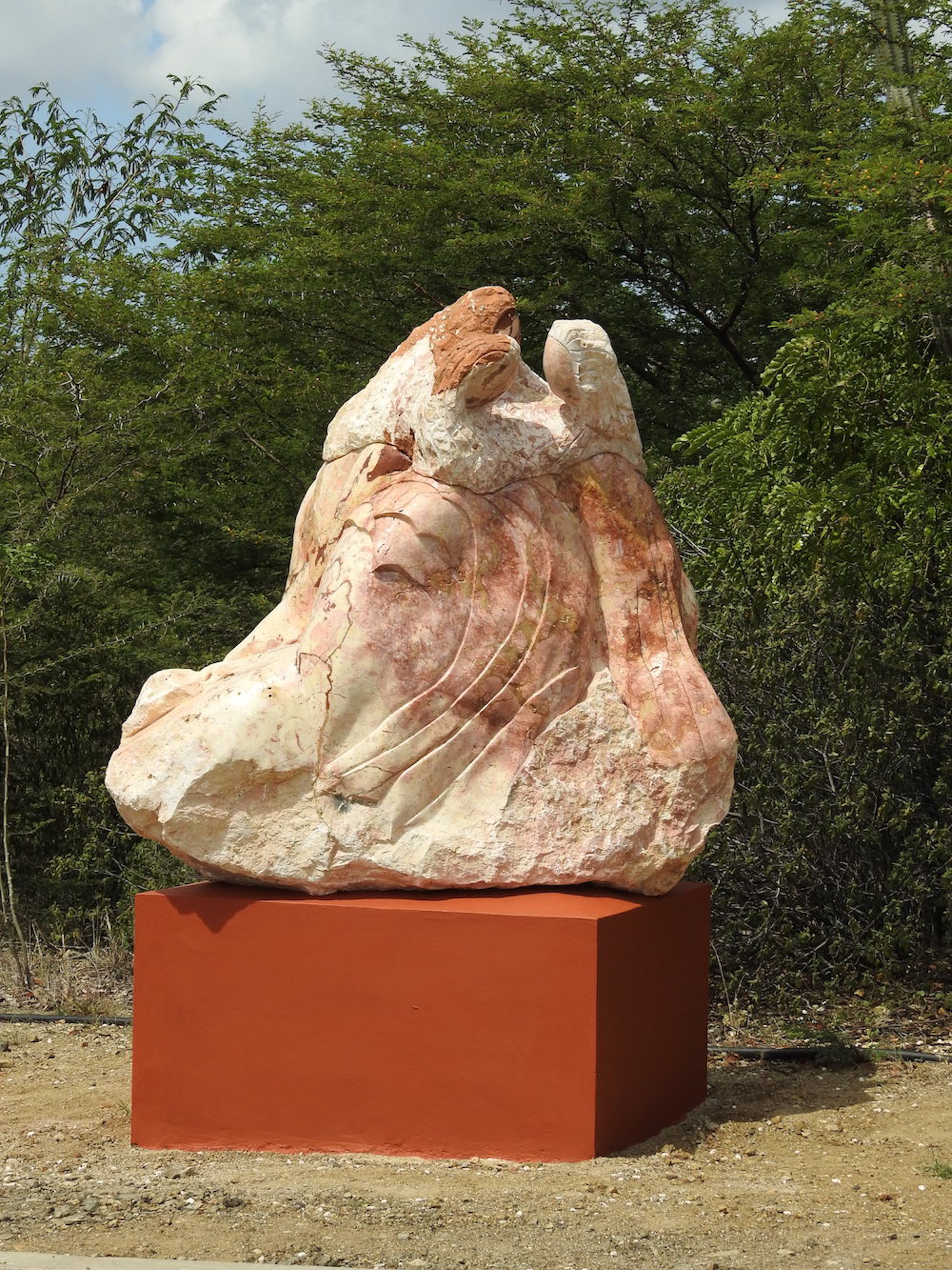
Redu by Rien te Hennepe

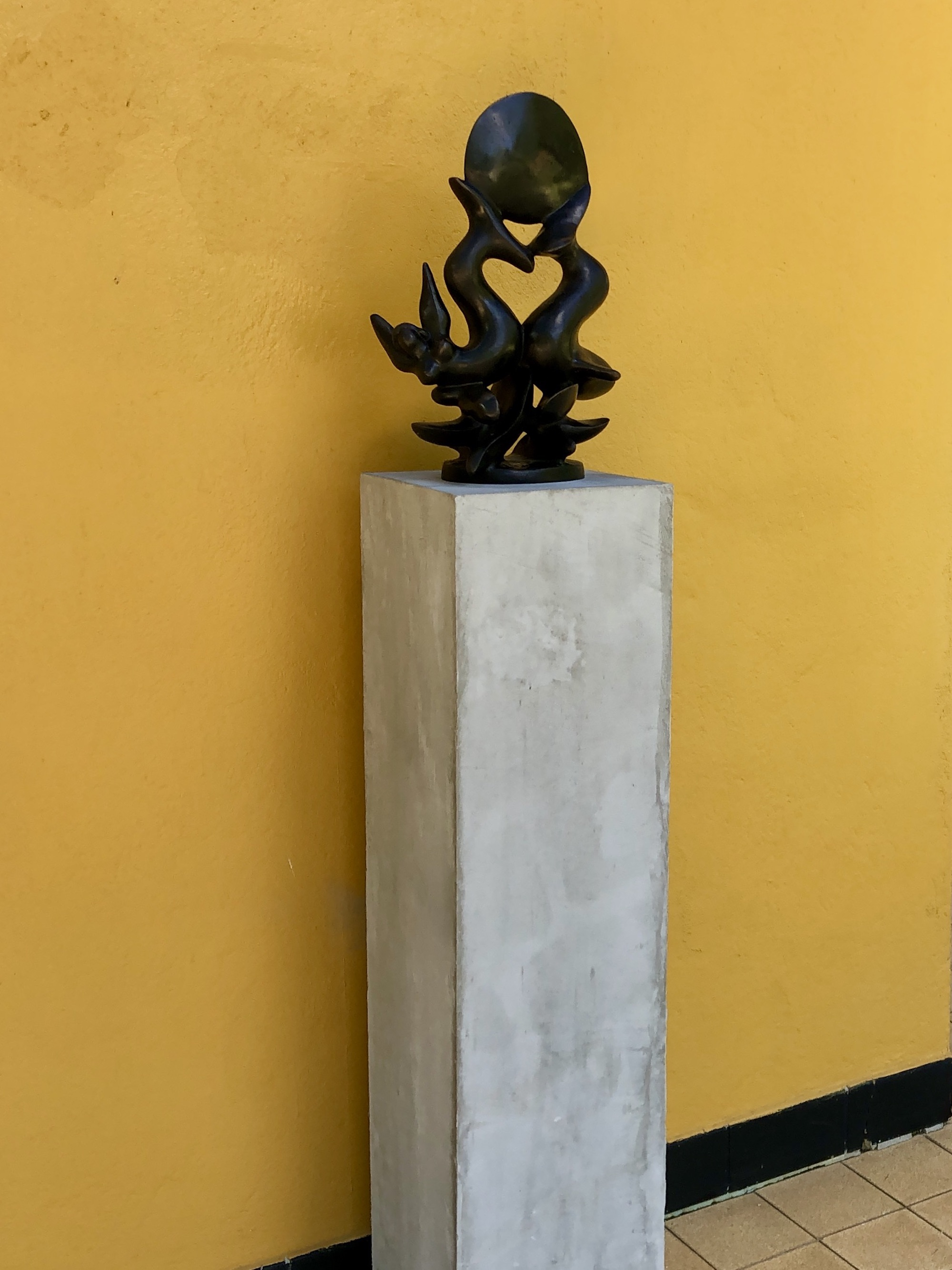
Pacific by Nic Jonk

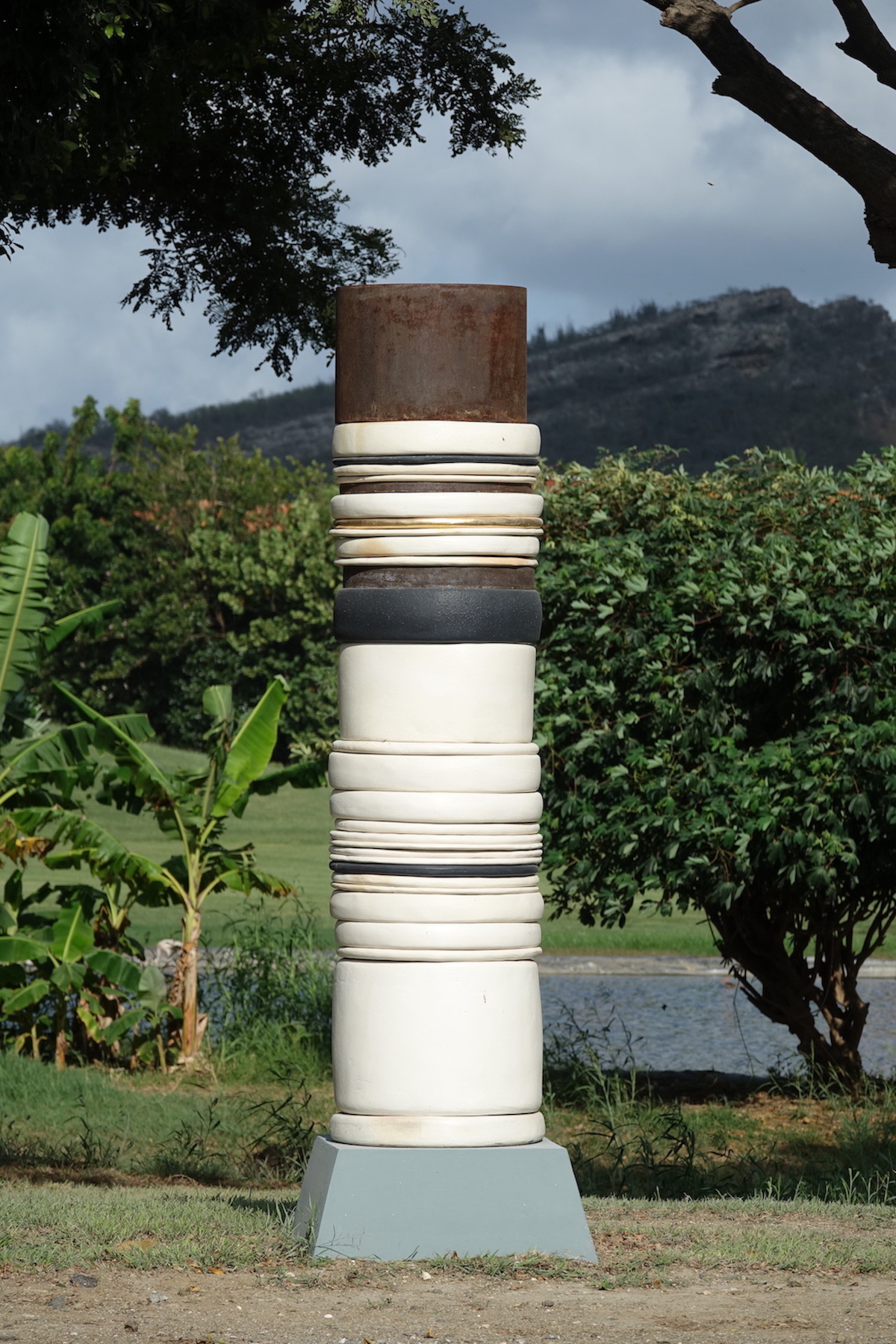
Door de jaren heen by Ellen Spijkstra

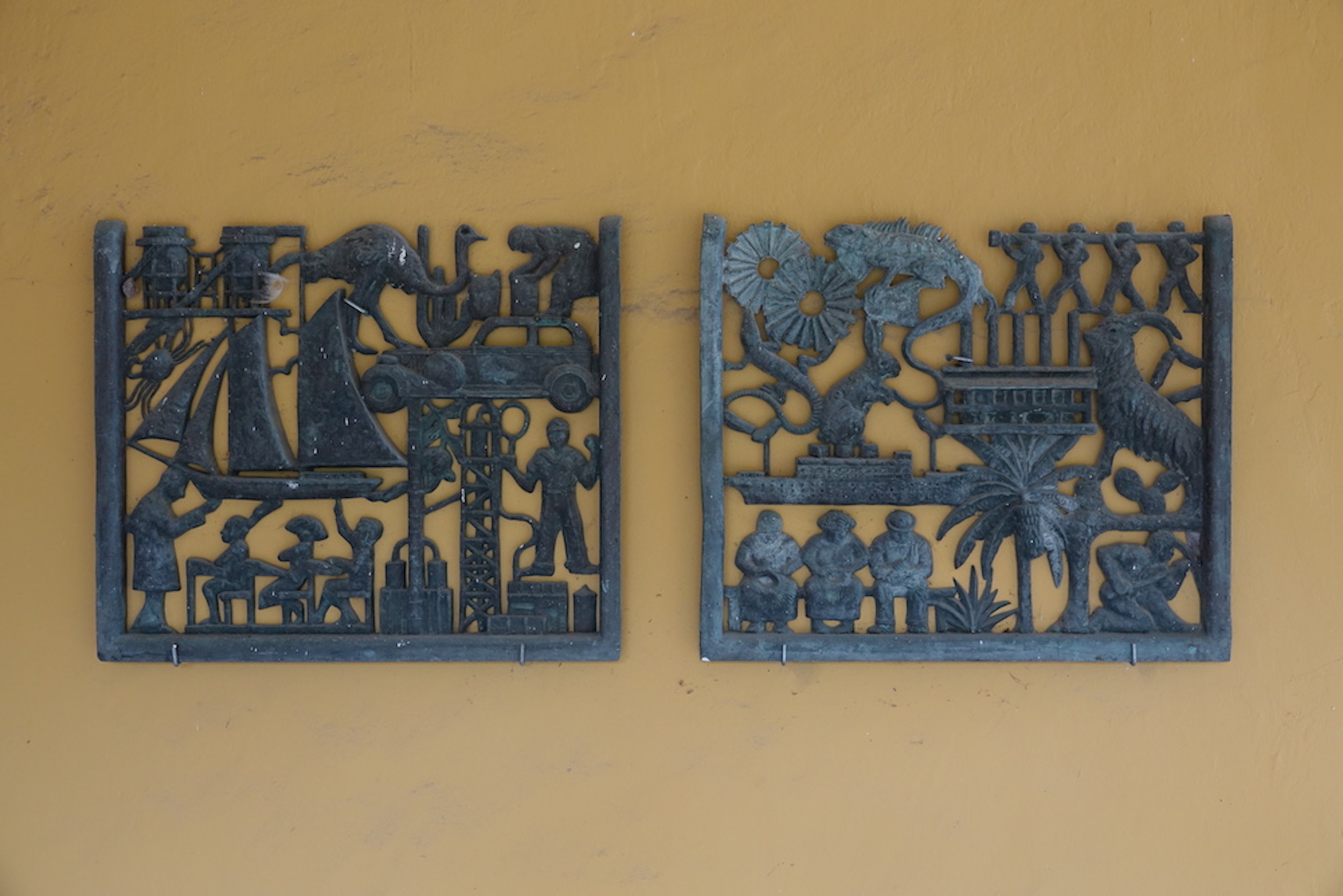
Lost monument by Gerrit van der Veen

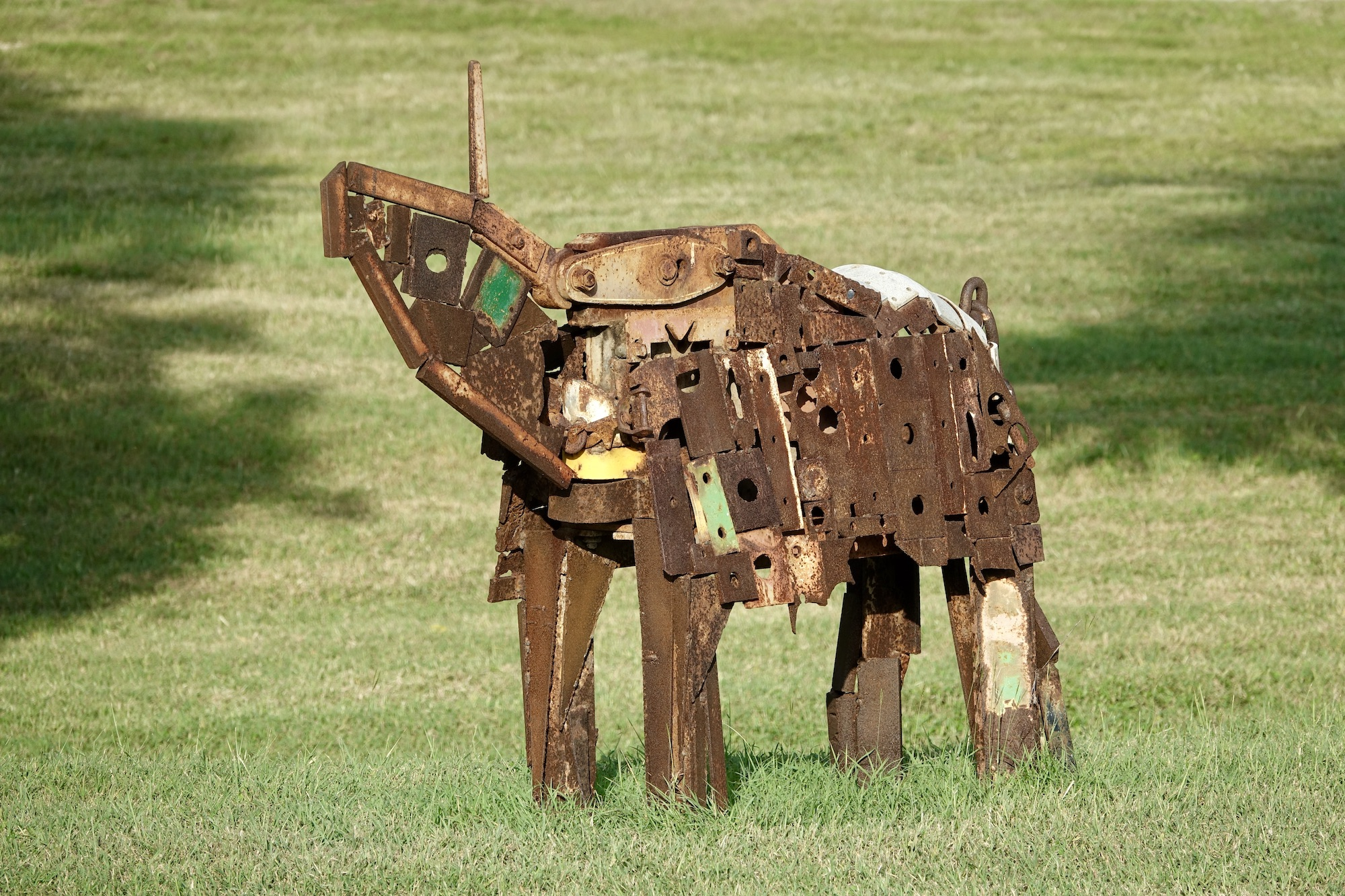
Eenhoorn by Brigitte Wawoe
