= Sint Michiel =

Sint Michiel Boca Samí
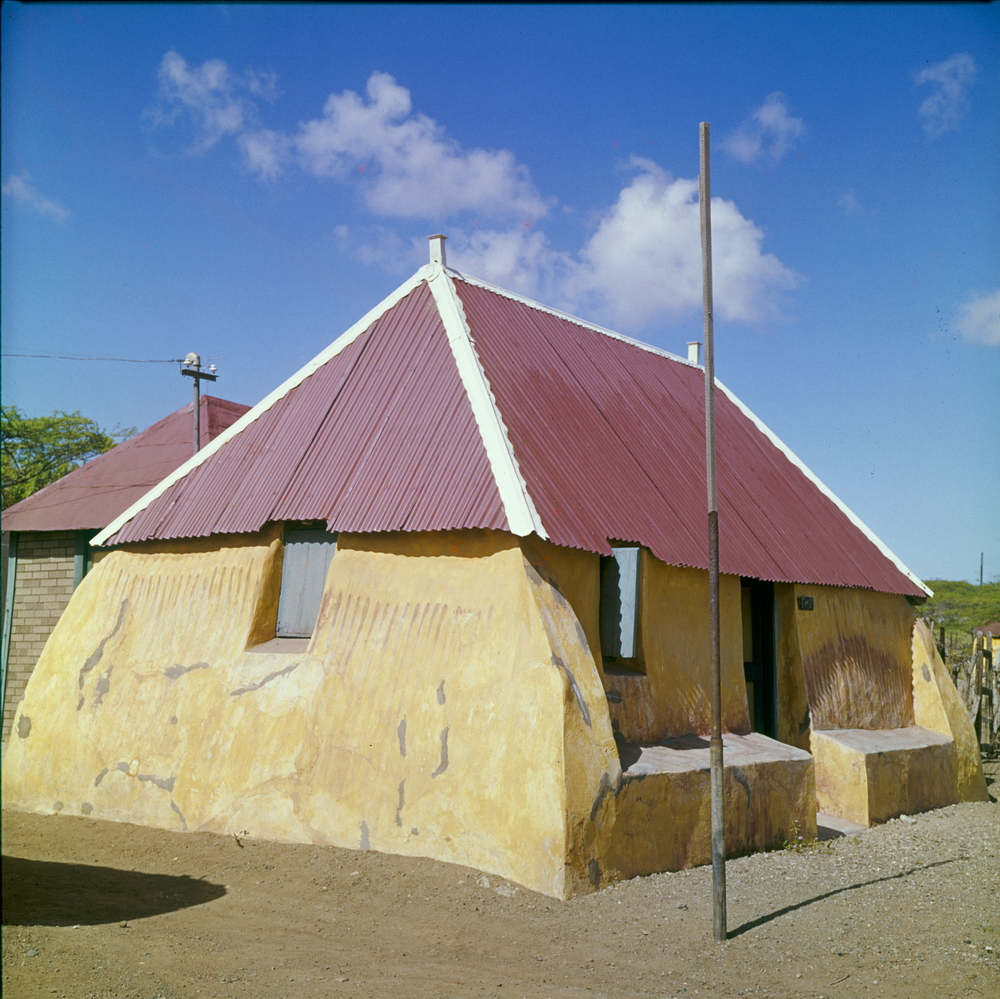
- Kunuku House (slave house) in Sint Michiel

- Location in Curaçao
- Coordinates: 12°08′32″N 068°59′45″W
- Country: Netherlands
- Constituent Country: Curaçao

Area
  - Total: 17.94 km^{2} (6.93 sq mi)

Population (2011)
  - Total: 5,732
  - Density: 319.5/km^{2} (827.5/sq mi)

Sint Michiel (also Boca Samí) is a former fishing village in Willemstad lying at the south end of Bullenbaai bay on the west coast of Curaçao. It is located 10 kilometres (6.2 miles) to the northwest of the island's city centre.

== Overview ==
The St. Michiel Bay is locally known as "Boca Samí" and is situated between the much smaller Blue Bay and Vaersenbaai. It is named after Saint Michael. Vaersen Bay used to be the Curaçao Police recreational facility. It is now the beach club Kokomo Beach Curacao.

The bay was once defended by two WIC forts. The ruins of the main fort are still visible. These forts provided protection from French pirates and the British Navy though they were occupied by both in the 18th and early 19th Century.

The settlement started in 1701, and used to be a quiet fishing village. During World War II, about 400 American troops were stationed at Sint Michiel. Tourism has resulted in the construction of hotels and holiday resorts in the neighbourhood. Sint Michael is the largest neighbourhood of Willemstad by area, and has a low population density. There is a steady population increase due to new housing developments. The per-capita income is above average, however there is a large income inequality in Sint Michiel.

The neighbourhood is surrounded by nature areas around the hills. Blue Bay is a bay with a beach, with tourist attractions, luxury apartments, the Blue Bay Sculpture Garden. and the Jong Colombia football team. A large salt pan near the bay is known for its population of flamingoes.

== Klein Sint Michiel ==
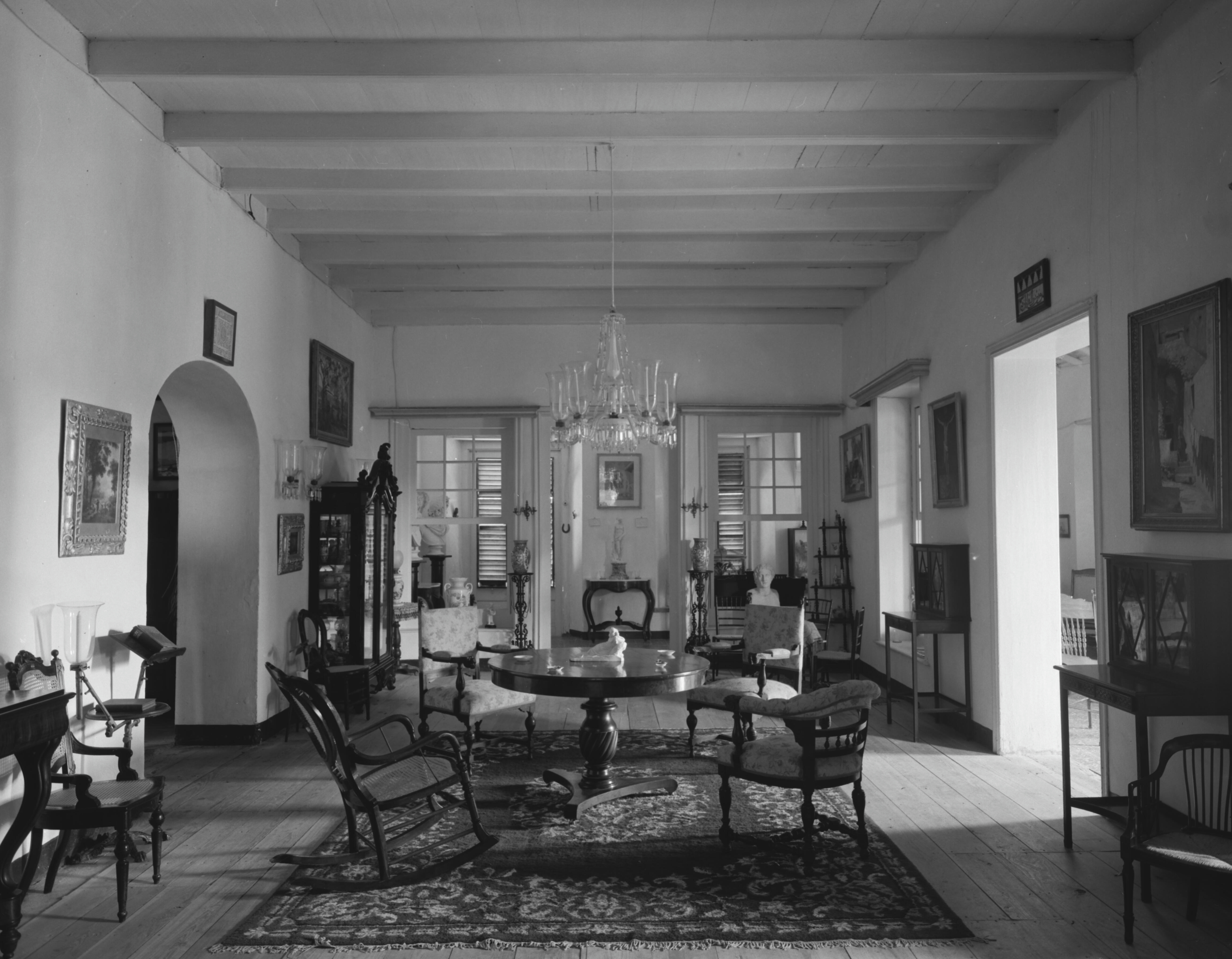
Interior of Klein Sint Michiel

Klein Sint Michiel was one of the major plantations of Curaçao, and used to produce salt. The current plantation house was constructed in 1863, and has a rectangular core with a gallery. The estate is privately owned and in near original condition, and has been designated a monument.

Archaeological artefacts have been discovered on the Sint Michielsberg on the former plantation grounds which are between 1,500 and 4,500 years old. The graves from the Archaic Period were undisturbed. The site is about one hectare in size, and the second largest archaeological site on Curaçao. Fundashon Kas Popular, a housing association, has constructed a housing estate on the plantation grounds.

== Notable people ==
- Shanon Carmelia (born 1989), footballer

== Gallery ==
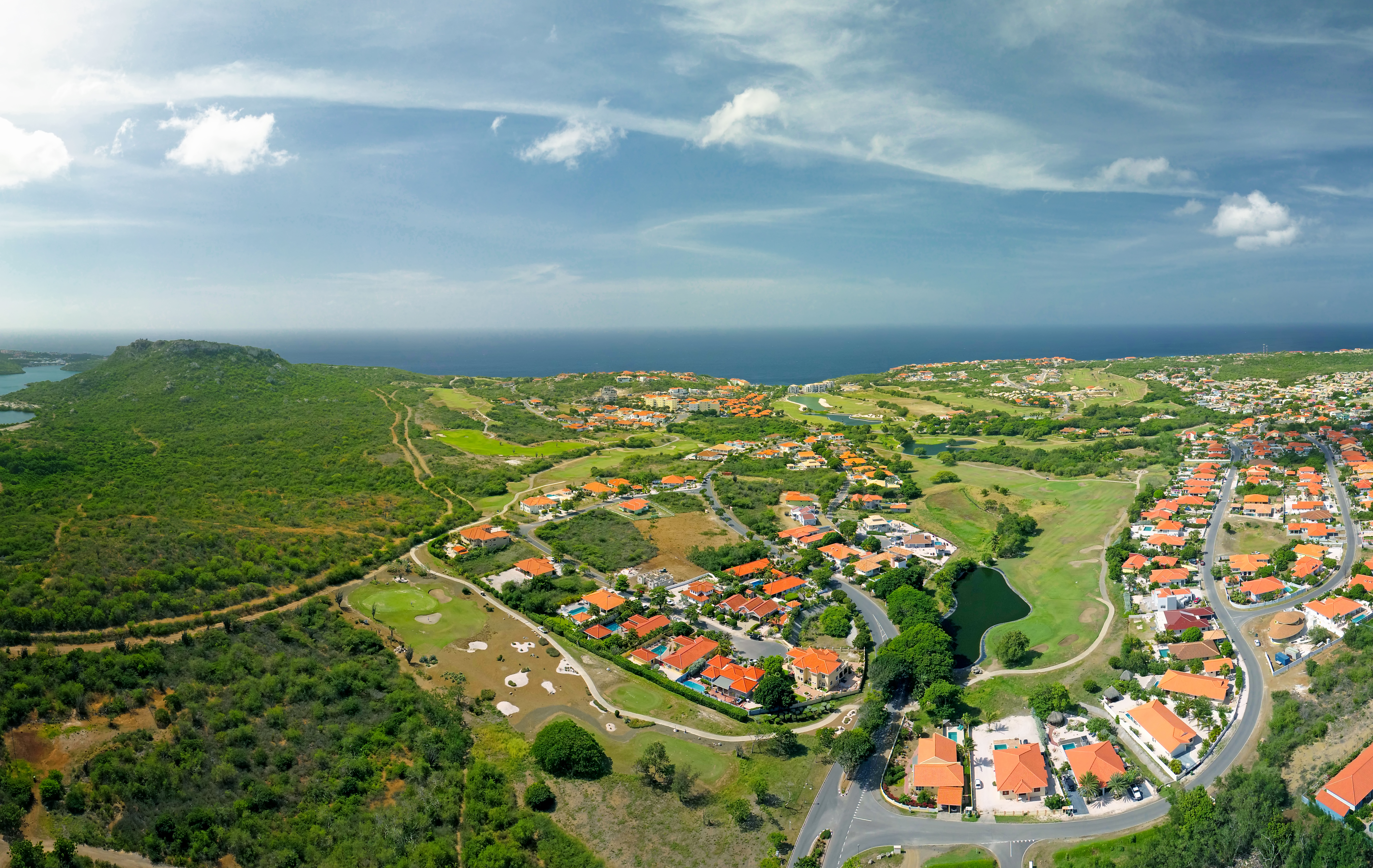
Blue Bay from the air

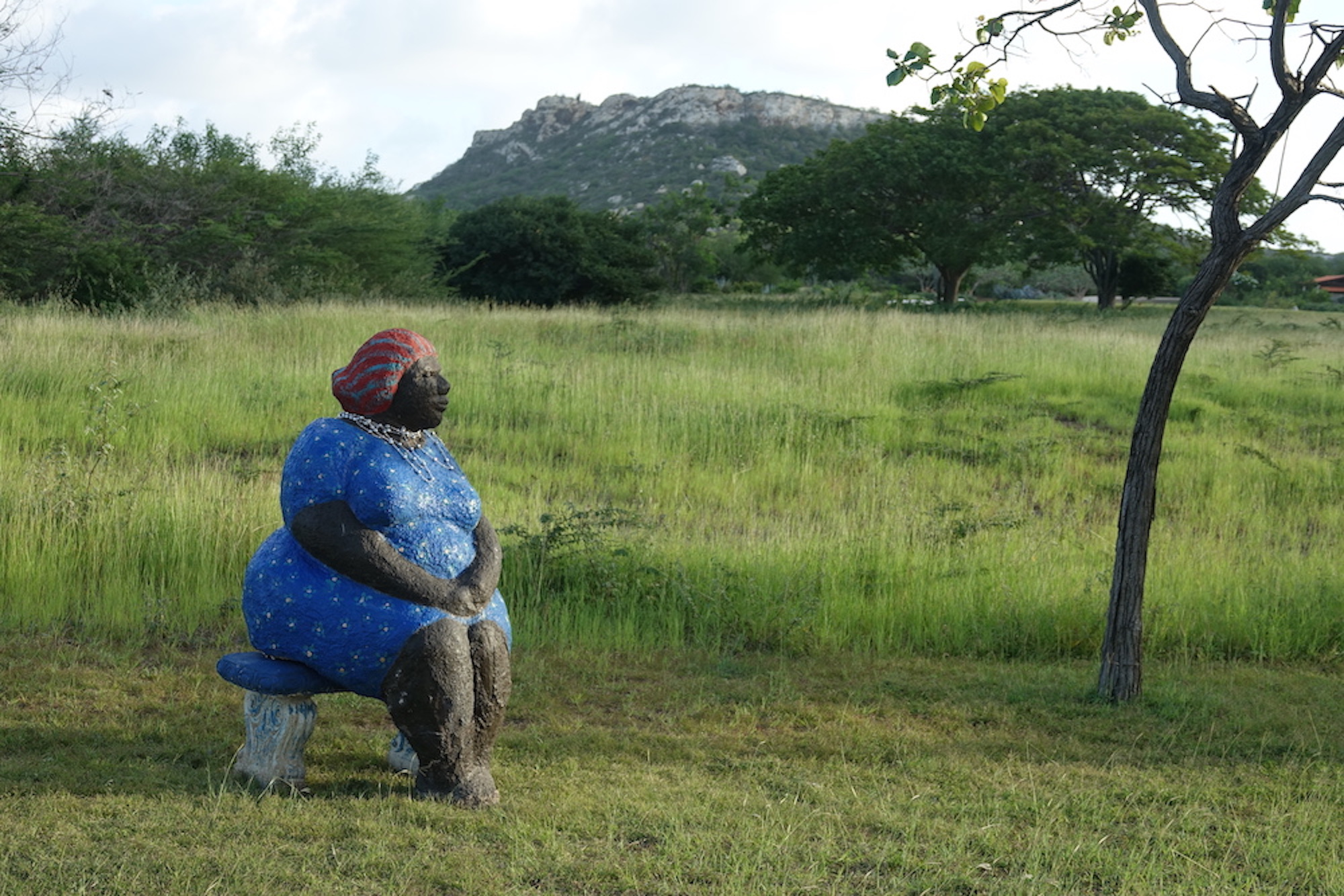
Big mama sitting in the sculpture garden

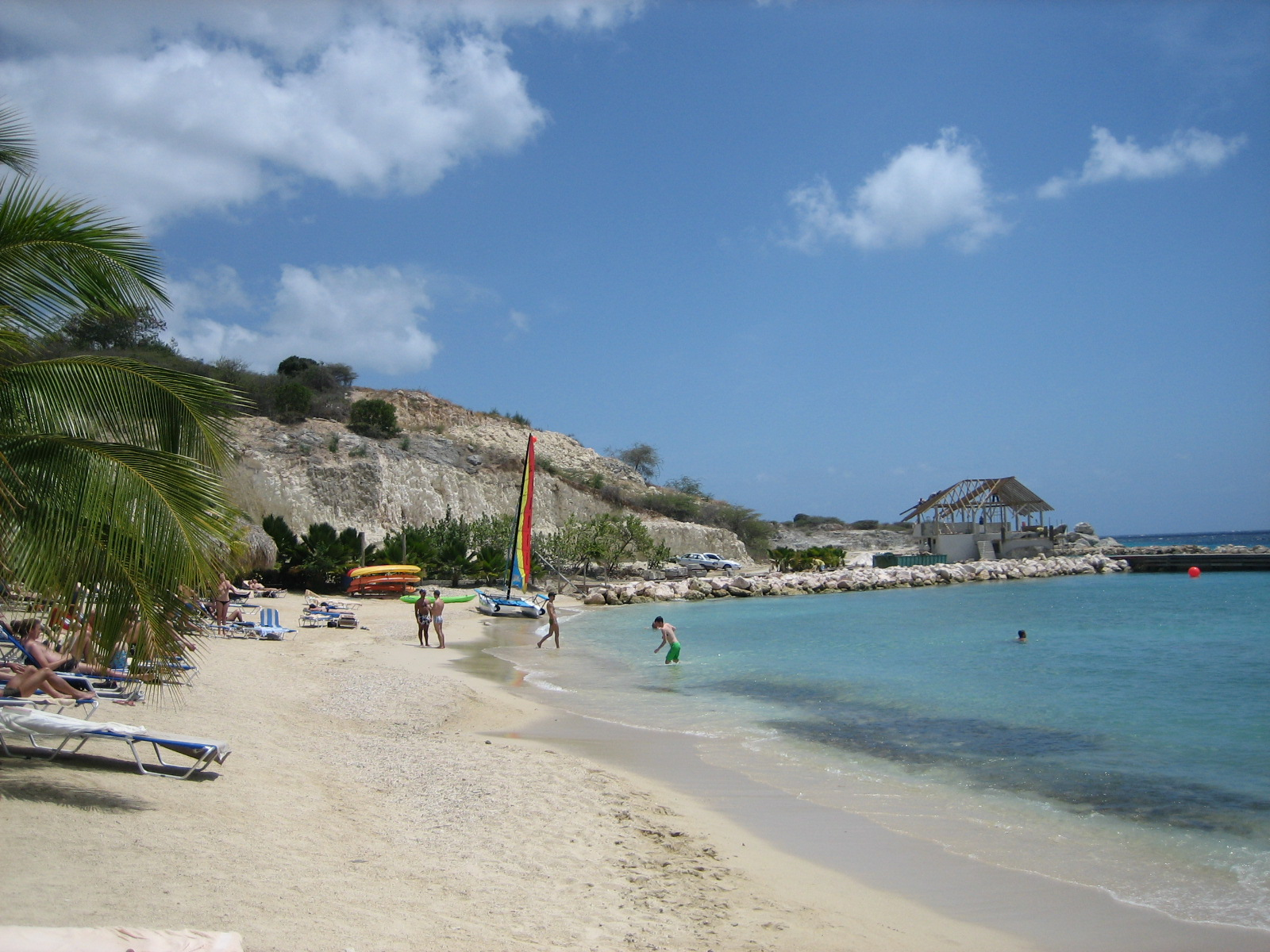
Beach at Blue Bay

== Bibliography ==
- Buurtprofiel Sint Michiel (2011). "Buurtprofiel Sint Michiel" (PDF). Government of Curaçao (in Dutch).
