= Landhuis Bloemhof =

Art gallery and museum in Curaçao

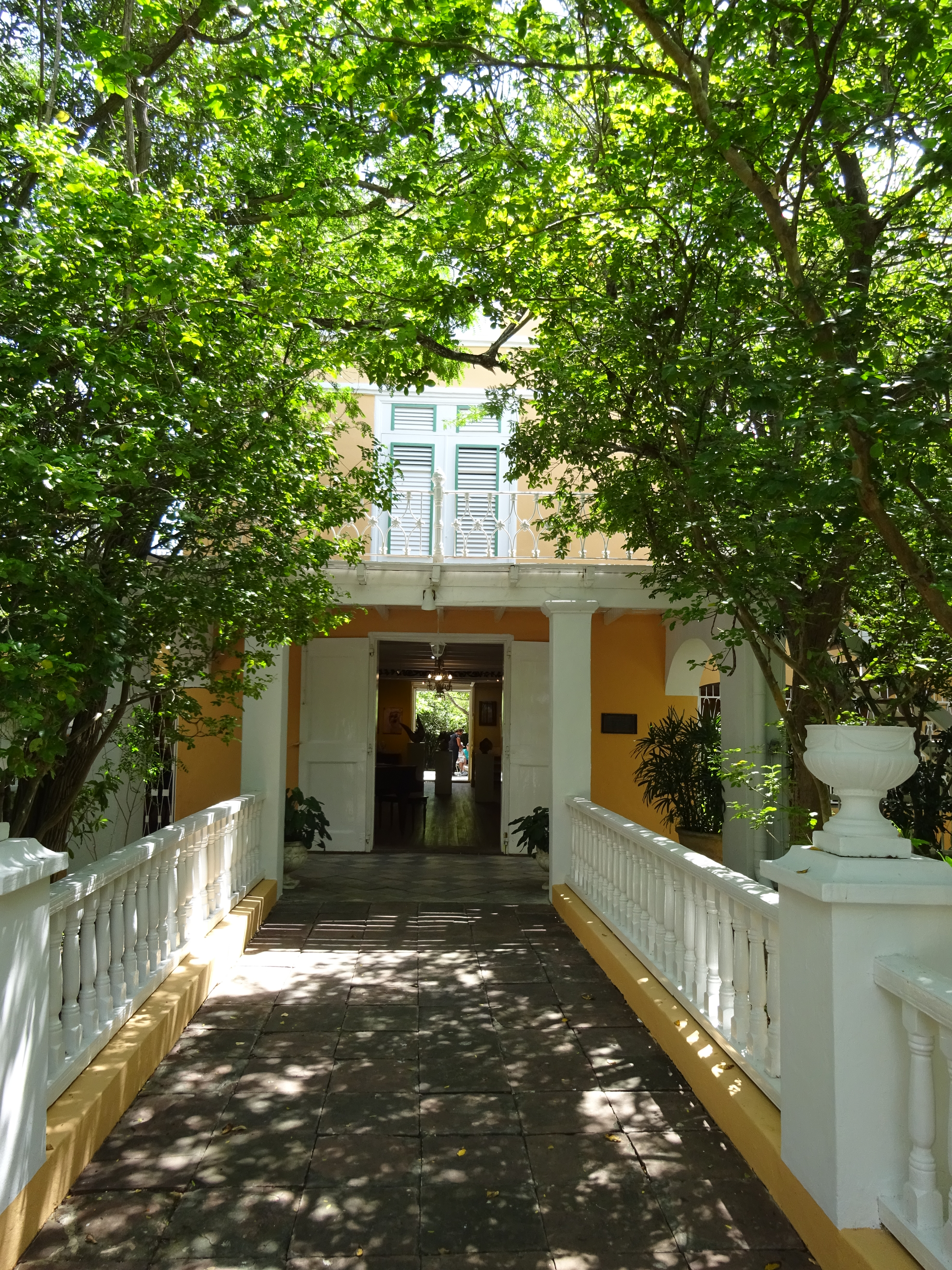
- The entrance to Landhuis Bloemhof

- Location within Curaçao
- Location: Santa Rosaweg, Willemstad, Curaçao
- Coordinates: 12.11934°N 68.90129°W
- Website: bloemhof.cw

Landhuis Bloemhof is a plantation house, art gallery and museum in Willemstad, Curaçao. The house was built in 1735 as Landhuis Nooitgedacht. During the 20th century, the house was owned by sculptor and writer May Henriquez and became a meeting place for the art scene of Curaçao.

== History ==
Landhuis Bloemhof was established in 1735 as a small plantation. It was mainly a water plantation which sold drinking water. On the premises, there are water wells, dams, an aqueduct, and several reservoirs. Until 1896, laraha, a bitter orange, was produced on the plantation. Laraha is one of the key ingredients for the liqueur Blue Curaçao.

In the early 20th century, the estate was owned by Max Frederic Henriquez who married May Henriquez in 1935. May Henriquez was interested in the arts. When the couple left for Caracas for business, she enrolled in a sculpture course. In the house, she created a studio, and her estate turned into a meeting place for the art scene of Curaçao attracting artists like Cola Debrot, Corneille and Peter Struycken. Henriquez became known as successful sculptor and author in Papiamentu.

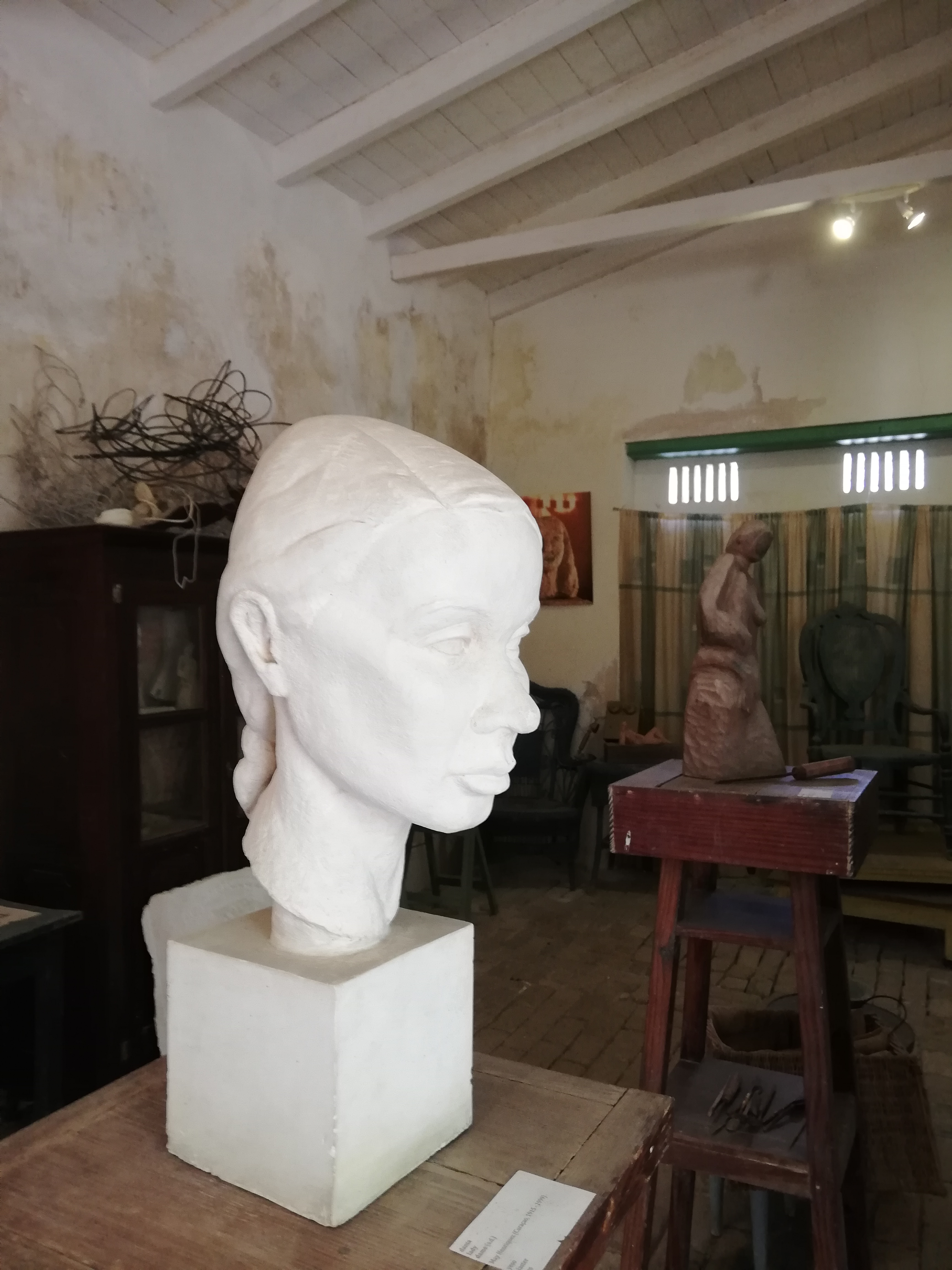
The studio of May Henriquez

Henriquez died in 1999. Landhuis Bloemhof was turned into a museum and art gallery, and is dedicated to her memory. The studio is in its original condition. The estate contains a large art collection and an extensive library. On the premises there is a large garden, a bath house, and a literary café.

In 2010, an open-air studio was opened for the Surinamese sculptor Hortence Brouwn. In 2020, the Cathedral of Thorns was built in the garden by Herman van Bergen. It is a cathedral and maze constructed using 30 million thorn bushes, and was constructed over a five-year period.
