= Waterfort =

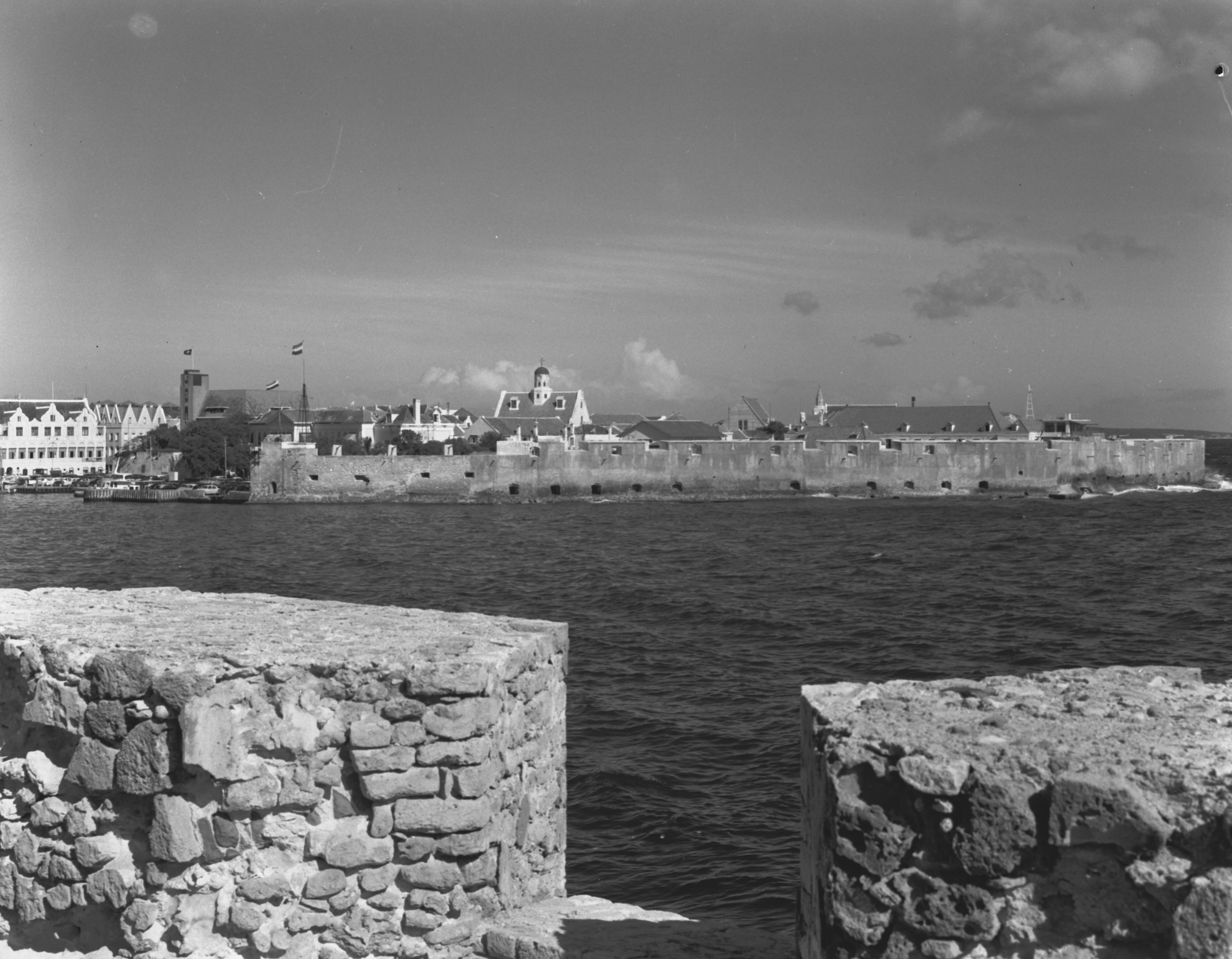
- Waterfort as seen from the Rif Fort (1954)
- Interactive map of the Waterfort area

General information
- Location: Willemstad, Curaçao
- Coordinates: 12.10380°N 68.93518°W
- Current tenants: Plaza Hotel Curaçao
- Construction started: 1827

Waterfort is a fort in Willemstad, Curaçao located on the eastern side of the Sint Anna Bay. It was built in 1827 to protect Willemstad against attack. In 1858, marines were stationed in the fort. During World War II, the fort was put into operation again. In 1955, the marines were moved to Marinebasis Parera, and Plaza Hotel Curaçao, a luxury hotel, was built in the fort.

== History ==
The earliest fort at the location dated from 1634, but was abandoned. In the 1820s, all existing forts except for Fort Beekenburg were in a neglected state, and governor Paulus Roelof Cantz'laar developed a plan to strengthen the fortifications of Curaçao. In 1825, William I of the Netherlands appointed Lieutenant General Krayenhoff to construct new defences. Krayenhoff arrived in Curaçao on 26 June.

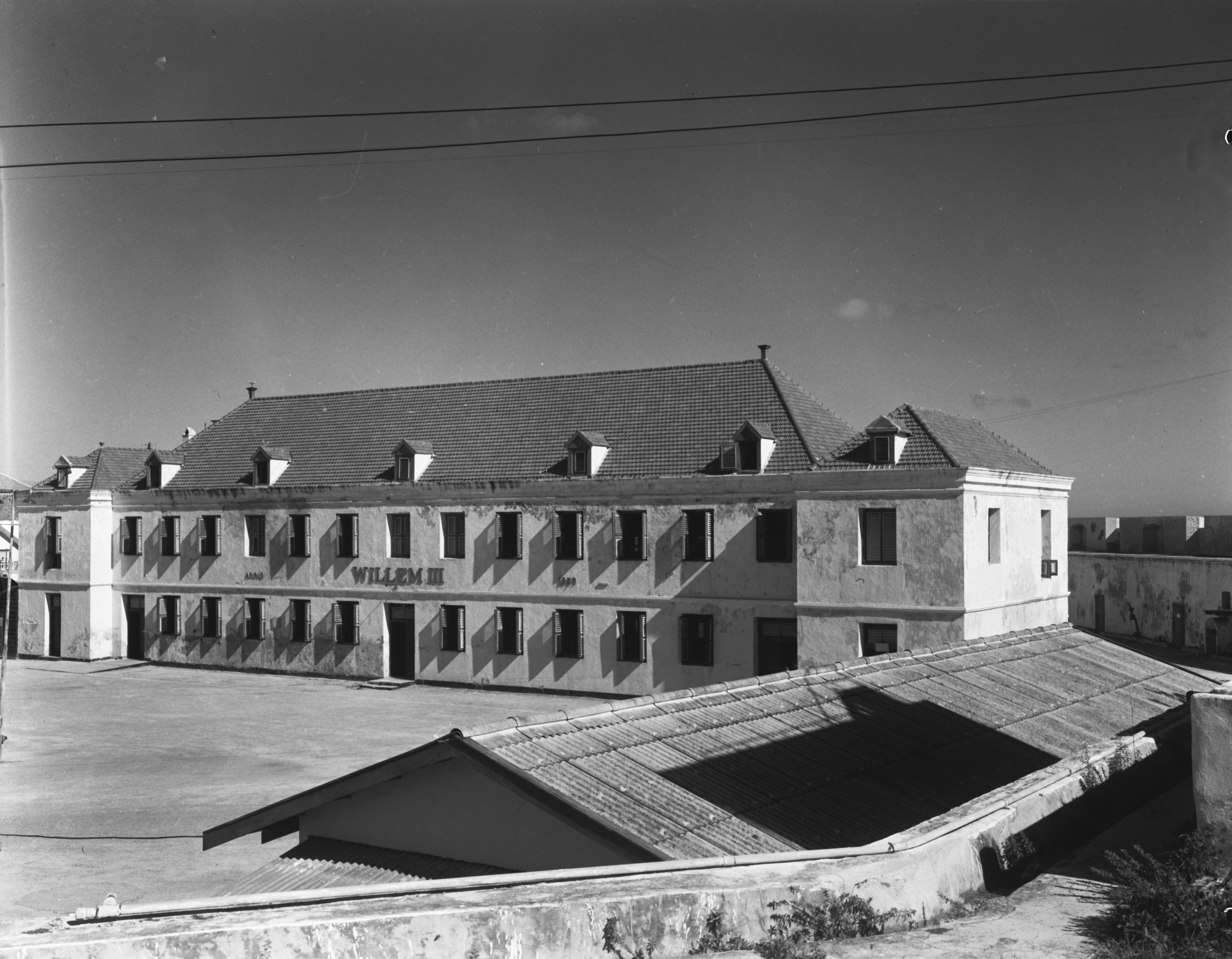
Willem III Barracks (1954)

The plan was to build Waterfort on the eastern side of the harbour and the Rif Fort on the western side. The plan was approved on 10 August 1826, and construction started in 1827. The completion of Waterfort meant that Fort Amsterdam no longer played a defensive role.

In 1858, the Willem III Barracks were built inside the fort to house 178 marines. By 1917, the fort had become obsolete, and had been abandoned. During World War II, the fort reopened, and the Netherlands Marine Corps reoccupied the barracks.

In 1955, it was decided to build Plaza Hotel Curaçao, a luxury hotel, inside the fort. The marines were relocated to Marinebasis Parera in late 1955, and the barracks were demolished.
