= Jacob Gelt Dekker =

Dutch businessman (1948–2019)

- Born: 22 April 1948; Oterleek, Netherlands
- Died: 1 September 2019 (aged 71); Key West, Florida, United States
- Occupation: Businessman
- Notable work: One Hour Super Photo; Budget Rent a Car; Kurá Hulanda Museum

Jacob Gelt Dekker (22 April 1948 – 1 September 2019) was a Dutch businessman, philanthropist, and writer.

Born in Oterleek, North Holland, Dekker attended school between 1961 and 1967 in Alkmaar and later studied dentistry in Amsterdam. He received an Executive MBA from Erasmus University of Rotterdam and the University of Rochester.

Following his education, Dekker created a series of entrepreneurial inventions, including the Splash Healthclubs in 1985 and One Hour Super Photo service, which Kodak later purchased. In 1981, he took over Budget Rent a Car in the Netherlands for 200,000 Dutch guilders, which he expanded from 20 cars to over 25,000 cars and sold in 1996 for 600 million NLG. In 2006 Dekker was #90 on the list of 500 richest Dutch citizens.

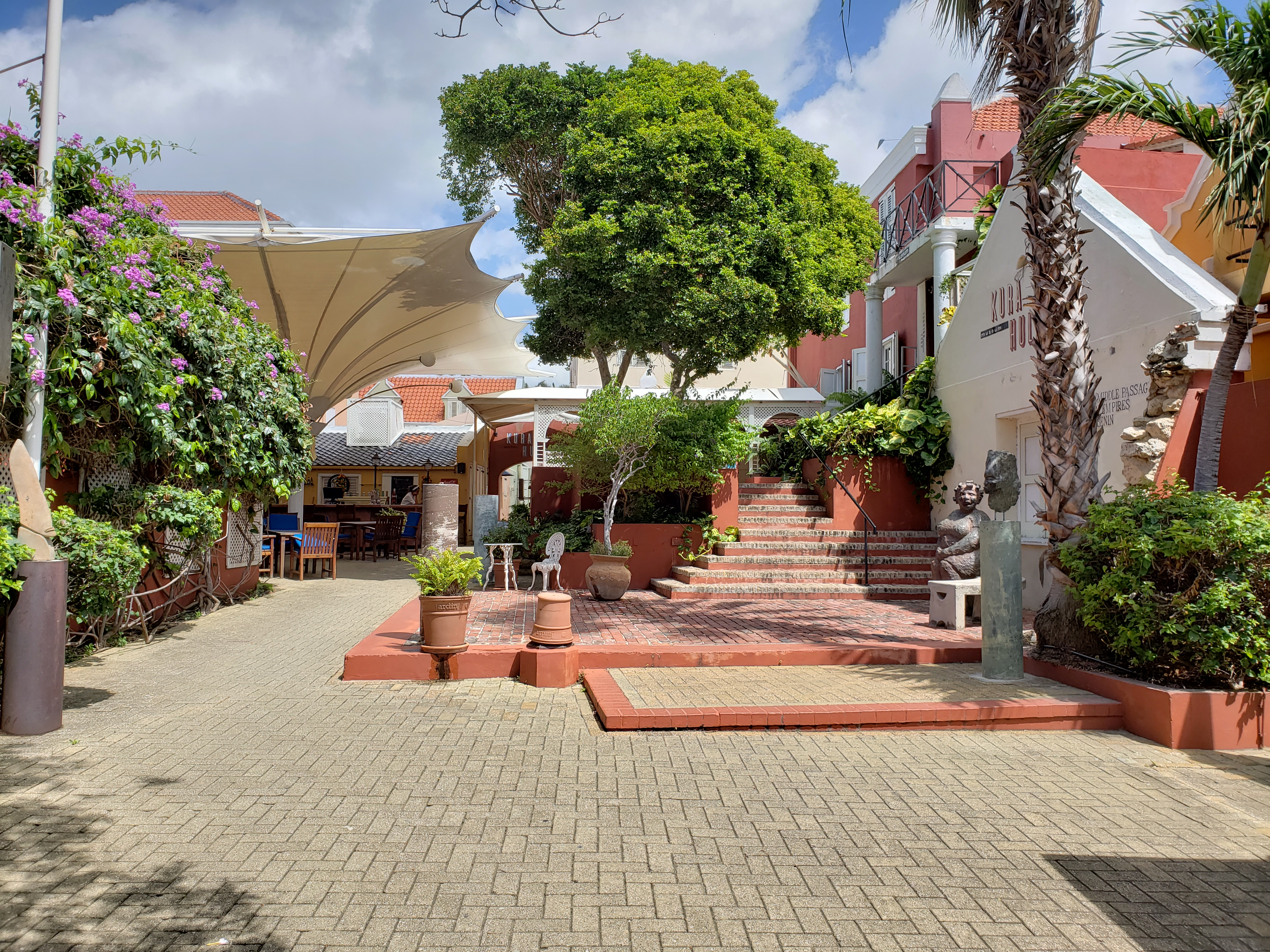
Kura Hulanda Museum entrance

In 1998, the Island Government of Curaçao granted Dekker permission to renovate a derelict quarter of the historic neighbourhood of Otrobanda into a hotel and casino, which subsequently filed for bankruptcy in 2013. On the same premises, Dekker founded the Kura Hulanda Museum, with 10 collections describing the slave trade.

In later years, Dekker involved himself in politics and philanthropy. In 2006, the Governor of the Netherlands Antilles awarded Dekker the prestigious rank of Officer of the Order of Orange-Nassau. Dekker was a cofounder of the Kura Hulanda Foundation, the Dekker-Padget Dutch2USA Internship Program, and Givingback Nederlands.

Dekker was treated for cancer. After he published The Caribbean (Amsterdam Publishers 2018), he started work on a publication about immigrants.

Dekker died after a long battle with cancer at his home in Key West, Florida in the United States on 1 September 2019 at the age of 71.

== Bibliography ==
- Dekker, Jacob Gelt. Bajanala, a stranger in Africa S.N., 1998. ISBN 9789990403312
- Dekker, Jacob Gelt. The Caribbean. Oegstgeest, Amsterdam Publishers, 2018. ISBN 9789492371744
