= Queen Emma =

Queen Emma may refer to:

- Hemma (c. 803–876), queen of East Francia
- Emma of France (c. 894–934), queen of West Francia
- Emma of Italy (c. 948–after 987), queen of West Francia
- Emma of Normandy (c. 988–1052), queen of England, Denmark and Norway
- Queen Emma of Hawaii (1836–1885), queen of Hawaii
- Emma Forsayth (1850–1913), businesswoman known as "Queen Emma of New Guinea"
- Emma of Waldeck and Pyrmont (1858–1934), queen of the Netherlands

== Ships and places ==
- HMS Queen Emma, a Royal Navy troop ship, formerly MS Koningin Emma
- Queen Emma Bridge, across St. Anna Bay in Curaçao
