= Health in Curaçao =

Life expectancy in the Country of Curaçao was 74.8 years for men and 81.0 years for women in 2016. Infant mortality in 2013 was 11.3 per 1,000 live births.

== Healthcare ==
Curaçao’s healthcare system is based on that of the Netherlands. The general practitioner functions as the system gatekeeper. There were 80 GPs in 2015. A Basic Health Care Insurance scheme, organized through the Social Insurance Bank was introduced on February 1, 2013. Health expenditure in 2011 was nearly US$503 million (ANG 900 million), or 16.6% of GDP.

The Department of Community Health Services and the Public Health Institute (Volksgezondheid Instituut Curaçao) are both part of the Ministry of Health, Environment, and Nature.

Some youth health services are provided by the White-Yellow Cross Foundation.

The FundashonPrevenshon organization provides breast and cervical cancer screening services.

There are three hospitals on Curaçao and some medical centres.:

- Curaçao Medical Center, Willemstad. This hospital was opened in 15 November 2019 and replaces the Sint-Elisabeth Hospital. It is a large and well-equipped medical facility.
- The Antillean Adventist Hospital
- The Capriles Clinic is a psychiatric hospital

There are three schools of medicine: St. Martinus University Faculty of Medicine, Avalon University School of Medicine and the Caribbean Medical University. They are all commercial enterprises and their qualifications are not accepted on the island.

There is no public policy in regards to medical care for undocumented immigrants, of which there are about 15,000. Immigration policies discourage these people from seeking preventative care or treatment. The cost of treatment falls on the providers.
