= Joseph Salerno =

Joseph Salerno may refer to:

- Joseph P. Salerno, American architect
- Joseph T. Salerno, American economist
- Joe Salerno, American basketball coach
