= Queen Juliana Bridge =

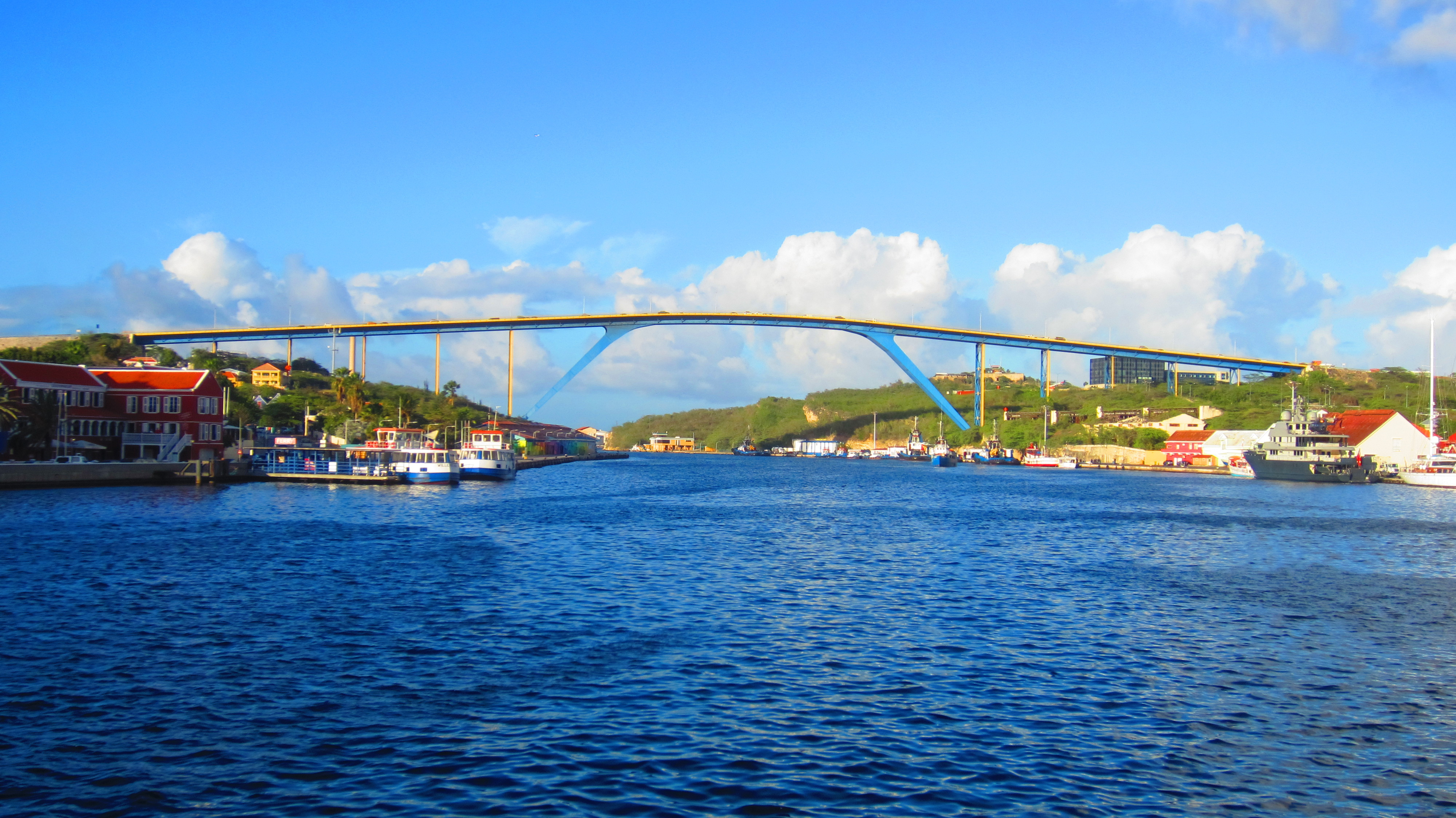
- The Queen Juliana Bridge seen from the southwest
- Coordinates: 12°6′40″N 68°55′55″W
- Carries: Four lanes of Schottegatweg
- Crosses: Sint Anna Bay
- Locale: Willemstad

Characteristics
- Design: Rigid frame bridge with inclined legs
- Total length: 500 m (1,640.4 ft)
- Clearance below: 56.4 m (185.0 ft)

History
- Opened: 1974; 52 years ago

Location
- Interactive map of Queen Juliana Bridge

Queen Juliana Bridge (Dutch: Koningin Julianabrug, Papiamento: Brug di Reina Juliana) is a four-lane road bridge across St. Anna Bay in Willemstad, the capital of Caribbean island country Curaçao, which is part of the Kingdom of the Netherlands. The bridge is named after Juliana of the Netherlands. While under construction, the eastern part of the bridge collapsed in 1967, killing fifteen workers, and was replaced. The current bridge opened on Queen's Day, 30 April 1974.

Reaching a height of 56.4 metres (185 feet) above the water at its apex (to accommodate ships entering the narrow harbour), it weighs 3,400 tons. The view from the apex includes the entire panorama of Punda, Otrobanda, and the Schottegat and is one of the highest vantage points on the island.

The Queen Juliana bridge was constructed to allow automobile traffic to cross from Punda to Otrobanda. Once the Queen Juliana bridge was completed, the Queen Emma Bridge was closed to traffic and now only serves pedestrians.

== Gallery ==
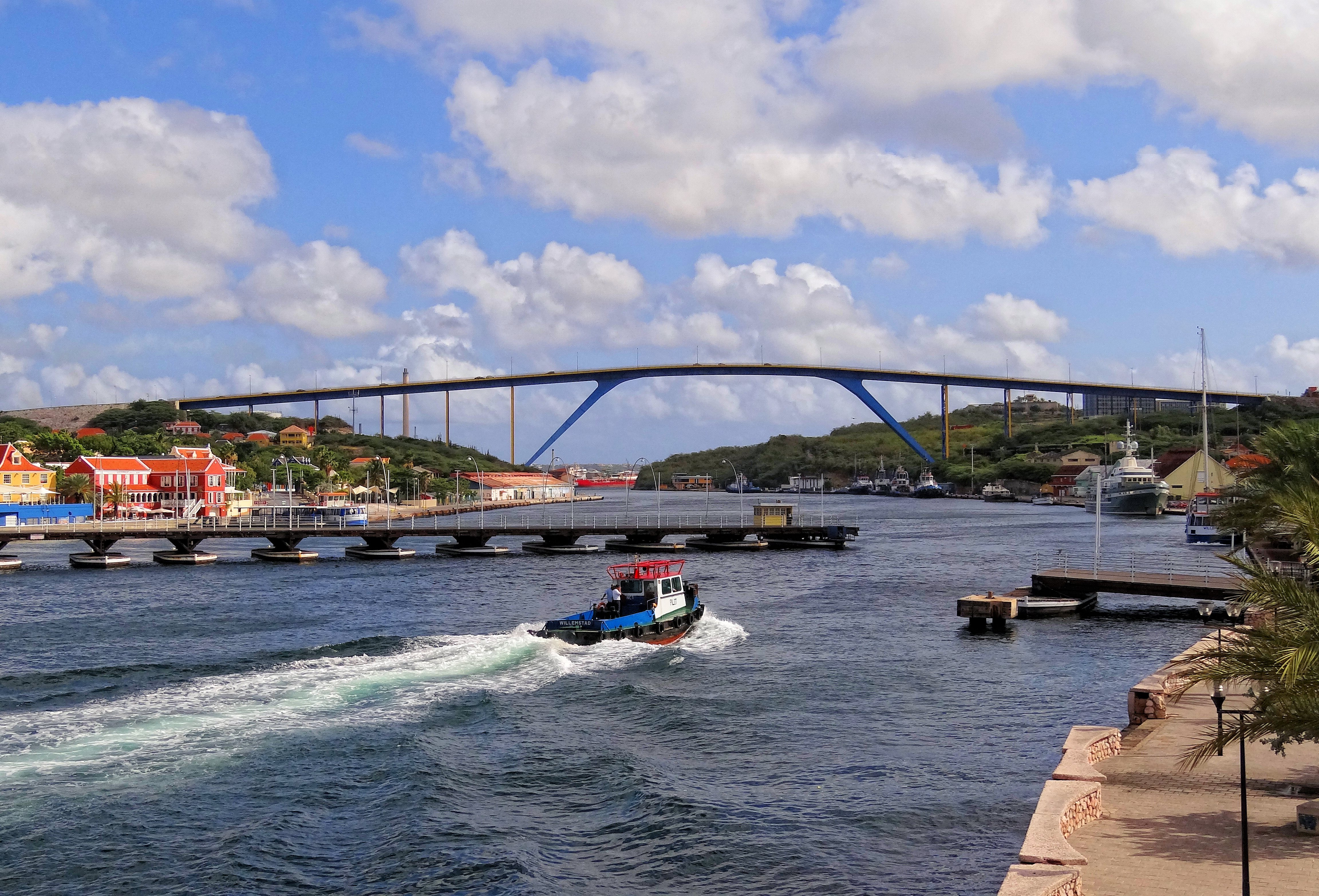
The Queen Juliana (background) bridge replaced the Queen Emma bridge (foreground) for vehicle traffic
