= Pedro E. Guerrero =

American photographer (1917–2012)

Pedro E. Guerrero (September 5, 1917 – September 13, 2012) was an American photographer known for his extraordinary access to Frank Lloyd Wright. He was a sought-after architectural photographer in the 1950s. In a career shift that was part serendipity and part the result of being blacklisted by the major shelter magazines for his stance against the Vietnam War, he later concentrated on documenting the work and lives of the American artists Alexander Calder and Louise Nevelson.

== Early life ==
Guerrero was born in Casa Grande, Arizona, to Rosaura and Pedro W. Guerrero, a sign painter who much later would found Rosarita, one of the first commercial Mexican food companies in the United States. The Guerrero family moved to a one-room house built on the footprint of a tent platform in Mesa, Arizona, soon after his birth.

All his life, Guerrero spoke bitterly of the casual bigotry he encountered growing up in Mesa, and he viewed his acceptance in 1937 to the Art Center School, then in Los Angeles, as deliverance.

Guerrero's seven-decade career in photography began in 1939 when the architect Frank Lloyd Wright impulsively hired him to record the ongoing construction at his winter home, Taliesin West, in Scottsdale, Arizona. Just 22 and an Art Center dropout, Guerrero had never seen anything like Wright's "desert camp," and he decided to treat it exactly as it appeared to him, as sculpture. The resulting photographs pleased the architect, and Wright soon invited him to join his Fellowship. Guerrero recorded the original Taliesin in Spring Green, Wisconsin, and other Wright projects before enlisting in the Army Air Corps in 1941. He was stationed in Italy, where he was a photo officer, running a laboratory that developed film taken from planes during bombing runs.

After his service in World War II, Guerrero rekindled his relationship with Wright, resuming an intimacy that has been described as that of a father and son. When it was possible for Wright to command his photographer of choice, it was always Guerrero. Guerrero's understanding of Wright, forged both in the drafting room and while waiting for the sun to fall just so on a redwood beam, made him an important interpreter of the architect's work. His Wright photographs are featured in dozens of books, including the definitive study of his work, “In the Nature of Materials,” by Henry-Russell Hitchcock. Guerrero often included people in his photographs, especially members of the Taliesin Fellowship, which gave the architecture a human scale and also showed how people lived in the buildings. As one of the few able to joke with the architect, Guerrero shot some of the only photographs that show him in a relaxed mode.

== Professional career ==
Guerrero's Wright portfolio was a passport in postwar New York City to freelance assignments for all the major shelter magazines. He established an international reputation photographing the world as it built and rebuilt, developing a particular specialty in the mid-century modern houses of the 1950s and 1960s, including those of Eero Saarinen, Edward Durell Stone, Marcel Breuer, Landis Gores, Philip Johnson, John Black Lee and Joseph Salerno. Magazine assignments also took him to Julia Child's pot-lined kitchen in Cambridge, Massachusetts, and to John Huston's castle in Ireland. He continued to document Wright and his work until a few days before the architect's death in 1959.

In 1963 a routine assignment for House and Garden magazine took him to the doorstep of sculptor Alexander Calder, the creator of the mobile. “Calder's studio was the most glorious mess I had ever seen,” Guerrero recalled. His magazine career came to an abrupt halt in 1968 when he was black-listed for his opposition to the Vietnam War. Over the next 13 years, he worked as closely with Calder as he had with Wright, documenting his home, studio and artwork in Roxbury, Connecticut, as well as his houses and studios in Sache, France. Any unhappiness he felt at being black-listed was compensated by the opportunity to shadow Calder, whose playful mobiles, stabiles, jewelry and homemade kitchen tools intrigued him every bit as much as Wright's masterpieces. In any event, he had, he said, grown weary of pristine interiors. From 1979 to 1984, Guerrero documented the severe and mysterious work of another sculptor he admired, Louise Nevelson, as well as her studio and home in Greenwich Village.

Among the many books illustrated with Guerrero's photographs are three of his own, Pedro E. Guerrero: A Photographer's Journey (2007); Picturing Wright: An Album from Frank Lloyd Wright's Photographer (re-released in 2015); and Calder at Home: The Joyous Environment of Alexander Calder (1998).

In his heyday, Guerrero never achieved the celebrity of the competition, which included Julius Shulman, Balthazar Korab and Ezra Stoller. Guerrero, who represented himself, was not particularly good at self-promotion, although he was, as Dwell magazine said, "a sublime storyteller —– with or without the camera." The black list began a long fallow period. that coincided with a temporary decline of interest in Wright. Exhibitions and critical acclaim came relatively late in life. Just before Guerrero died in 2012, the architectural critic Martin Filler wrote that Guerrero's pictures often surpassed "his contemporaries' typically glib endorsements of the work they depicted." Emily Bills, the former managing director of the Julius Shulman Institute, has described Guerrero's "canonical contributions to the history of architecture."

Guerrero, who lived for many years in New Canaan, Connecticut, died on September 13, 2012, at his home in Florence, Arizona, at age 95.

== Documentary ==
The documentary Pedro E. Guerrero: A Photographer’s Journey (Paradigm Productions) was aired in fall 2015 as a co-presentation of Latino Public Broadcasting's VOCES and WNET American Masters. The photographer was also the subject of the documentary Pedro E. Guerrero: Portrait of an Image Maker (Gnosis Ltd.), completed in 2007, and aired through 2012 on PBS.

== Bibliography ==
- Guerrero, Pedro E. A Photographer's Journey with Frank Lloyd Wright, Alexander Calder, and Louise Nevelson, Princeton Architectural Press, 2007, ISBN 978-1-56898-590-9
- Guerrero, Pedro E. Calder at Home: The Joyous Environment of Alexander Calder, Stewart, Tabori & Chang, 1998, ISBN 1-55670-655-3
- Guerrero, Pedro E. Picturing Wright: An Album from Frank Lloyd Wright's Photographer, Pomegranate Press, 1993, ISBN 1-56640-804-0
- Albee, Edward, introduction; photographs by Pedro E. Guerrero, "Louise Nevelson: Atmospheres and Environments," Clarkson N. Potter, 1980, ISBN 0-517-540541
- Arnason, H.H., text, photographs by Pedro E. Guerrero, "Calder," Van Nostrand, 1966.
