= Queen Emma Bridge =

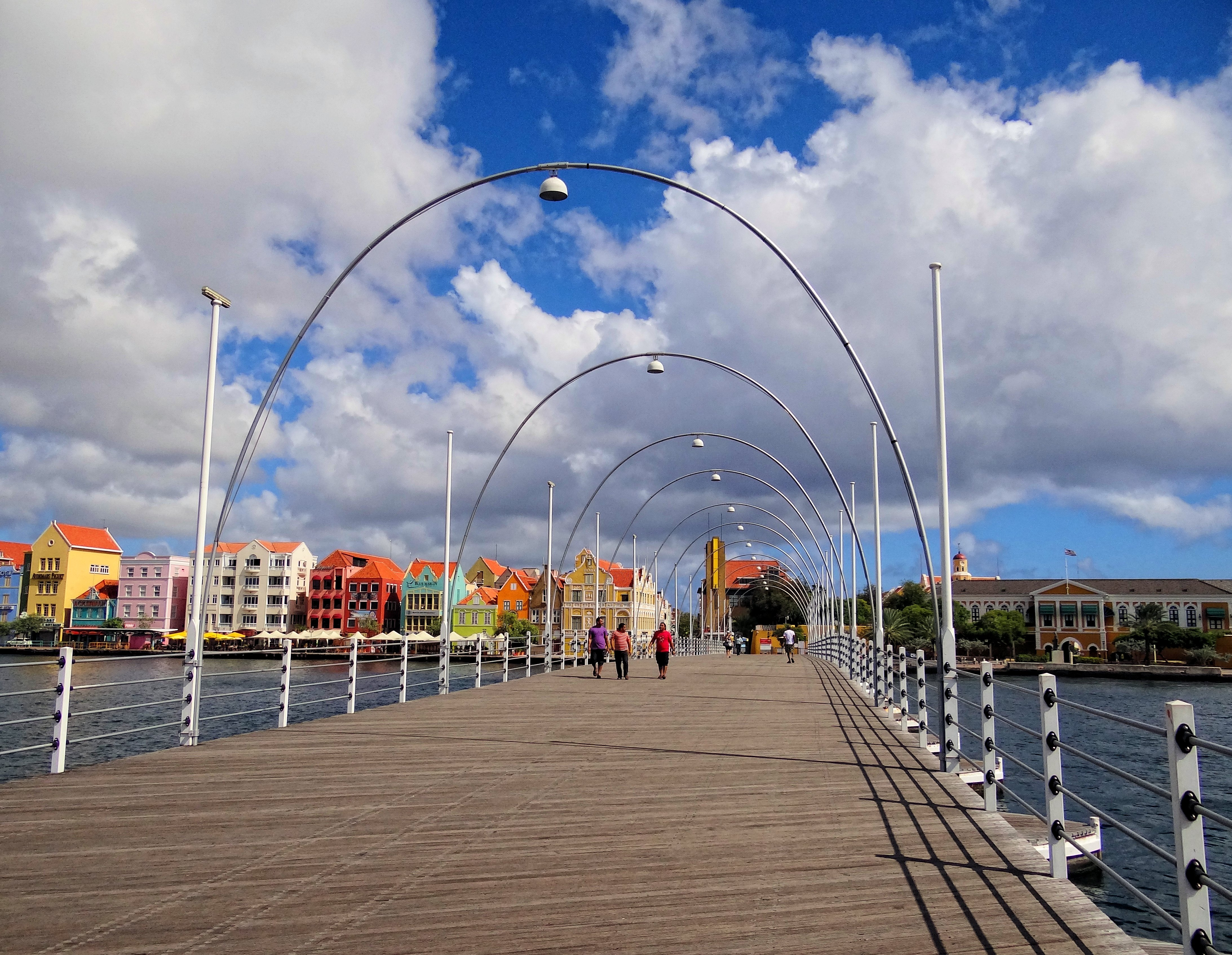
- The bridge seen from the Otrobanda end towards Punda
- Coordinates: 12°06′22″N 68°56′07″W
- Crosses: St. Anna bay
- Locale: Willemstad, Curaçao

Characteristics
- Design: Pontoon bridge
- Total length: 167 m (548 feet)
- Width: 9.80 m (32 feet)

History
- Opened: 1888, restored 1939 and 2006

Location
- Interactive map of Queen Emma Bridge

The Queen Emma Bridge (Dutch: Koningin Emmabrug; Papiamento: Brùg di Ponton, Brùg di Punda) is a pontoon bridge across St. Anna Bay on Curaçao island in the Dutch Caribbean. It connects the Punda and Otrobanda quarters of the capital city, Willemstad. It was named after Emma of Waldeck and Pyrmont, who was queen consort of the Netherlands during its construction. The bridge is hinged and opens regularly to enable the passage of oceangoing vessels. On the opposite end from the hinge is a small shelter where an operator controls two diesel engines turning propellers. The propellers are mounted perpendicular to the length of the bridge and allow it to swing parallel to the shore. The process only takes a few minutes to complete.

The bridge in 1955

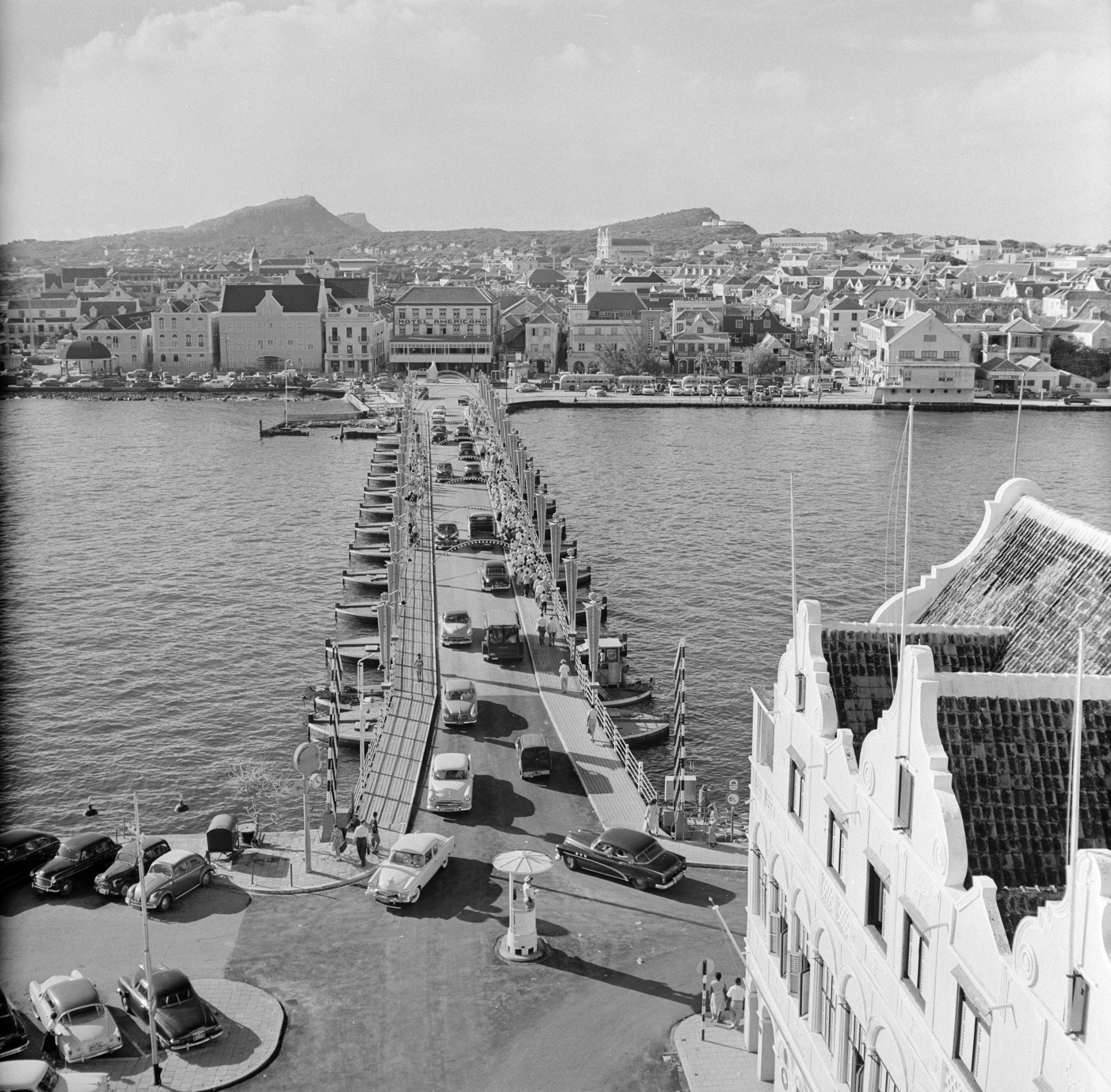
The bridge, closed and with car traffic

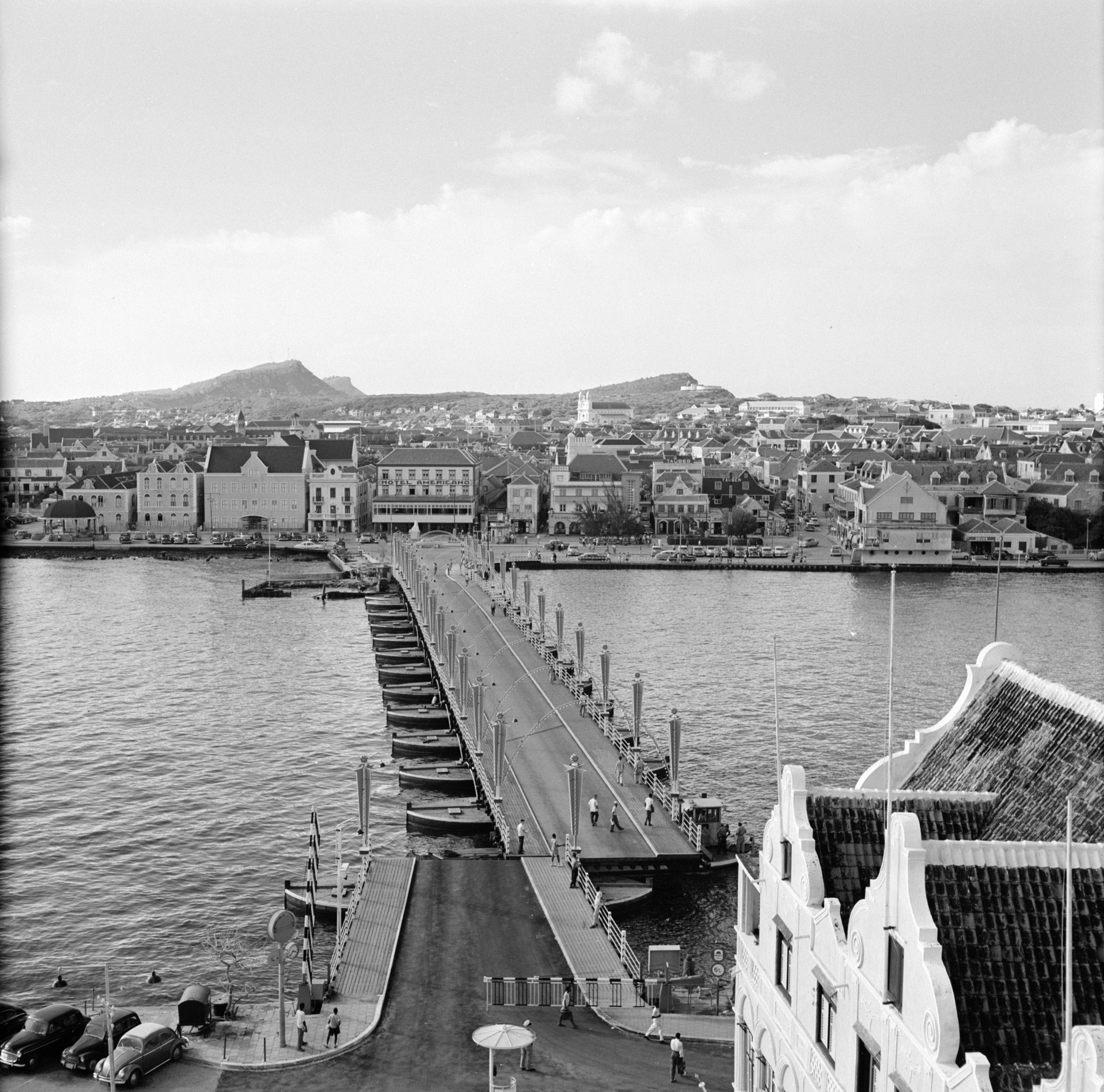
The bridge, beginning to open

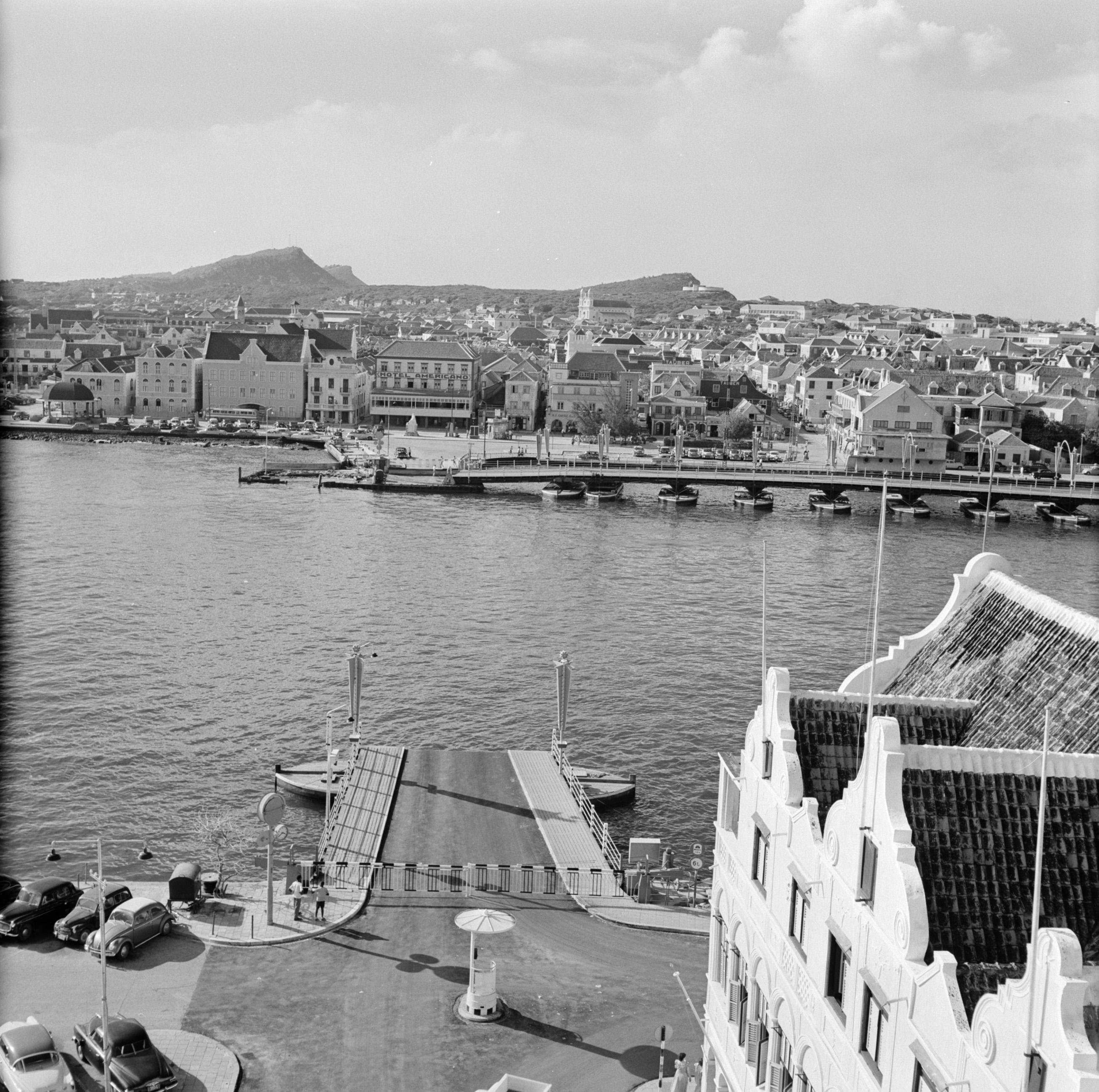
The bridge, open

The bridge was built in 1888 and was completely renovated in 1939, 1961, 1983–1986, and 2005–2006. The lighting arches were installed in 1955, to celebrate the royal visit of Queen Juliana and Prince Bernhard.

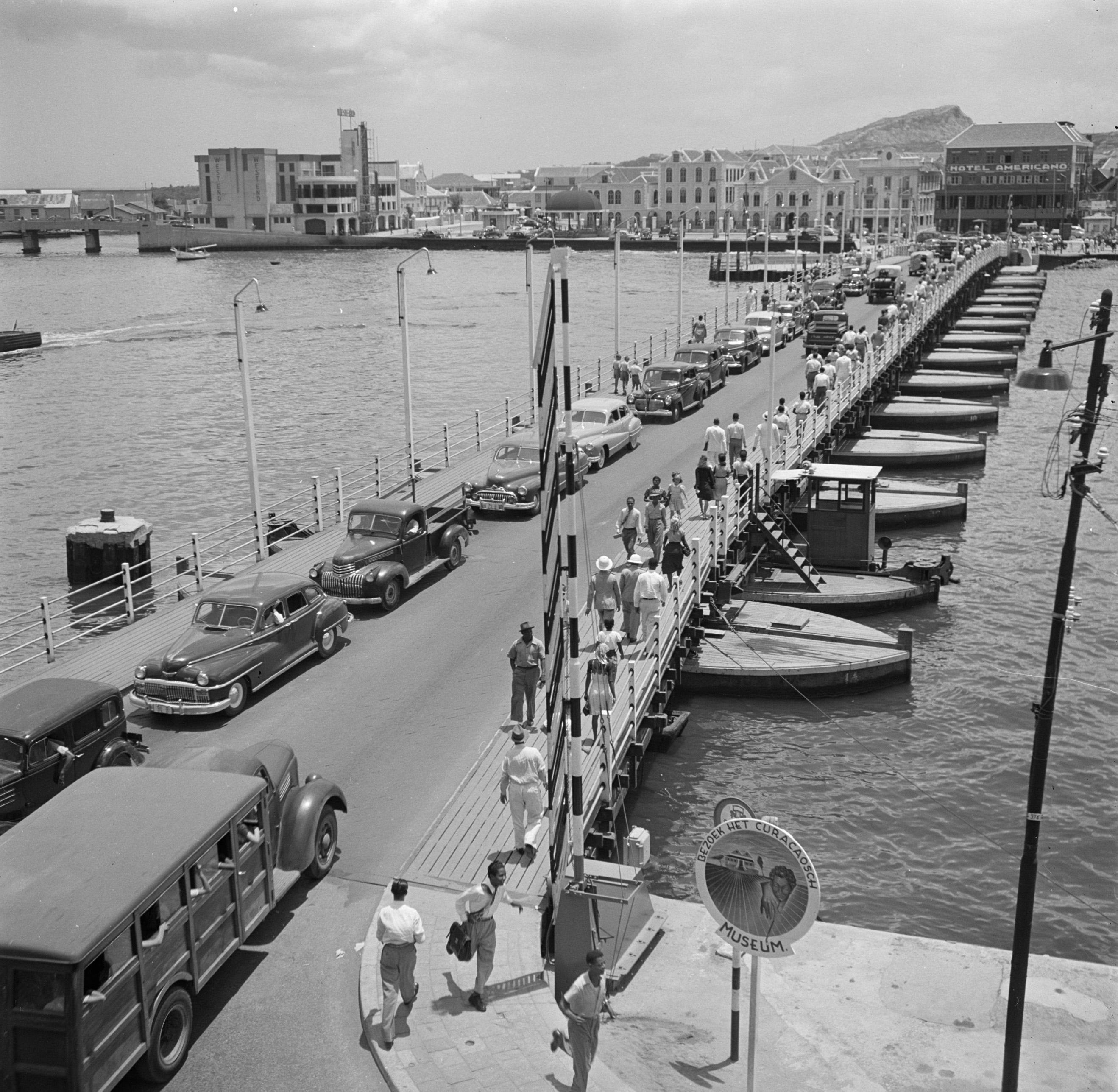
1947, before the lighting, and showing the operator cabin

Originally a toll bridge from 1901–1934, individuals without shoes were permitted to cross the bridge without paying the toll. When the bridge swings open, two ferries spring into action to bring pedestrians across the water. The ferries are also free of charge. Motor vehicle traffic ceased in 1974 when all such traffic was diverted to the newly opened Queen Juliana Bridge, and the bridge became pedestrian-only. Locally, the bridge is known as the "Swinging Old Lady" because of how it literally swings open to the Otrabanda side of Willemstad.

== Gallery ==
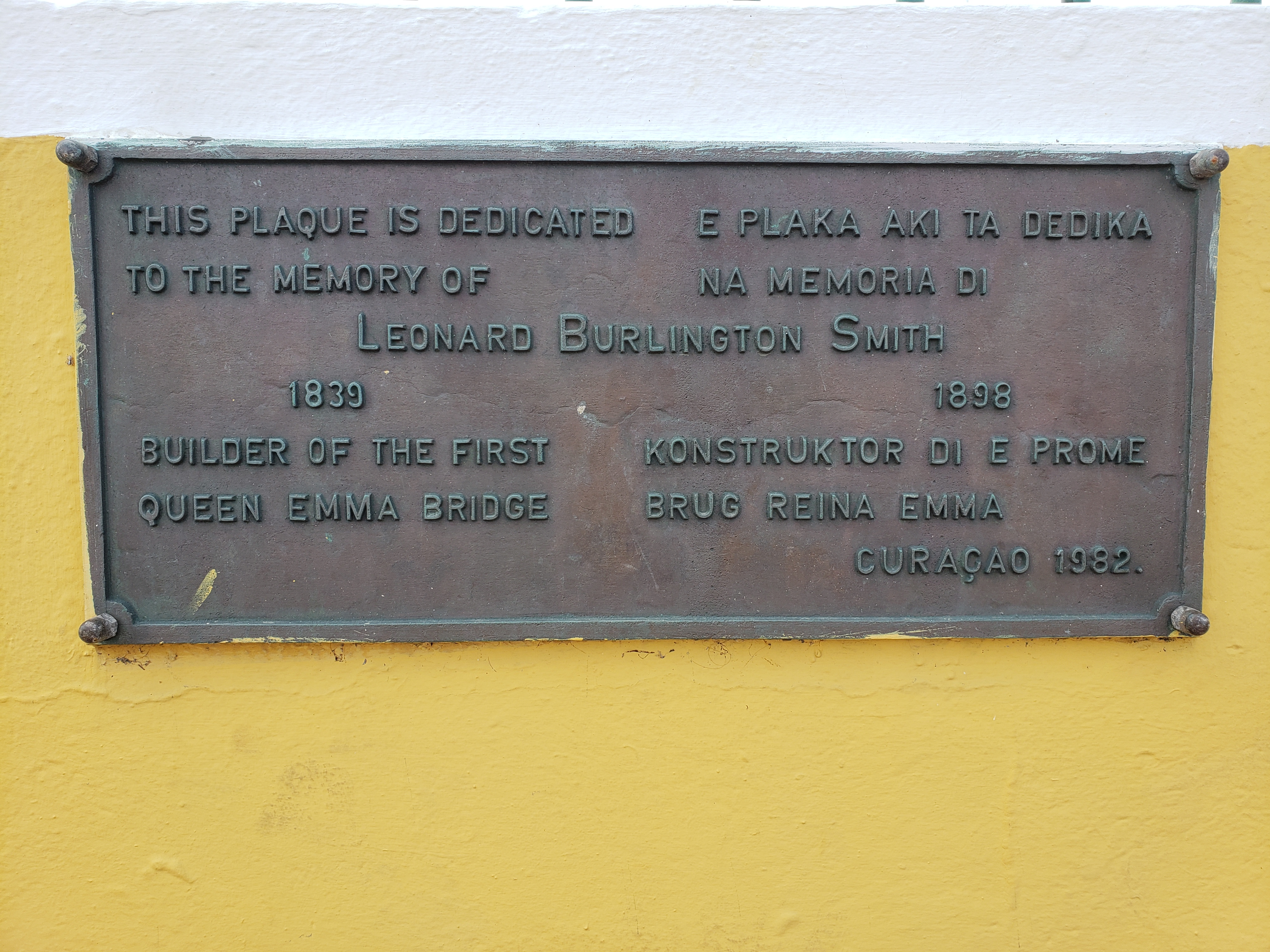
Historical marker for the construction of Queen Emma Bridge

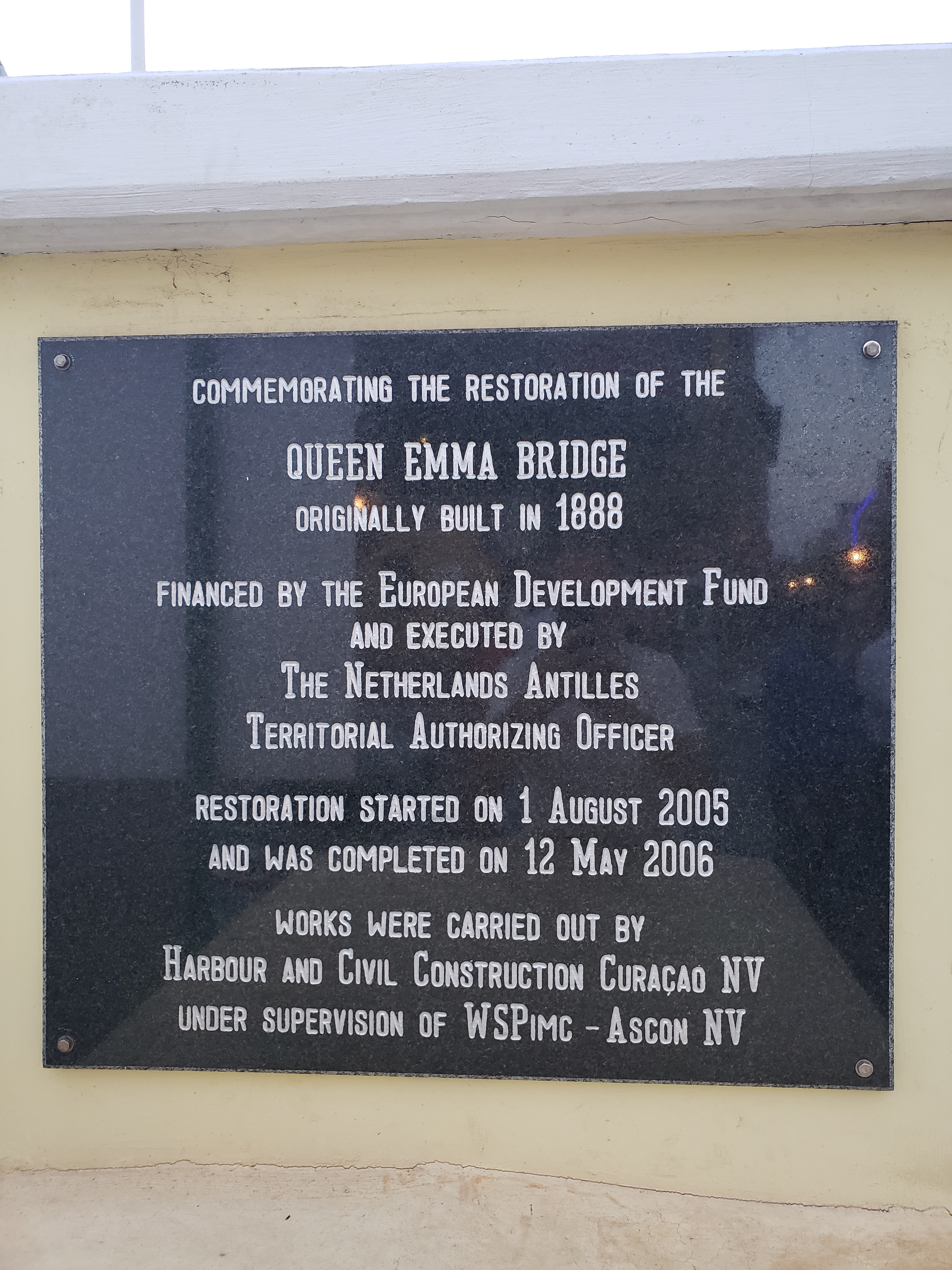
Historical marker for the restoration of Queen Emma Bridge

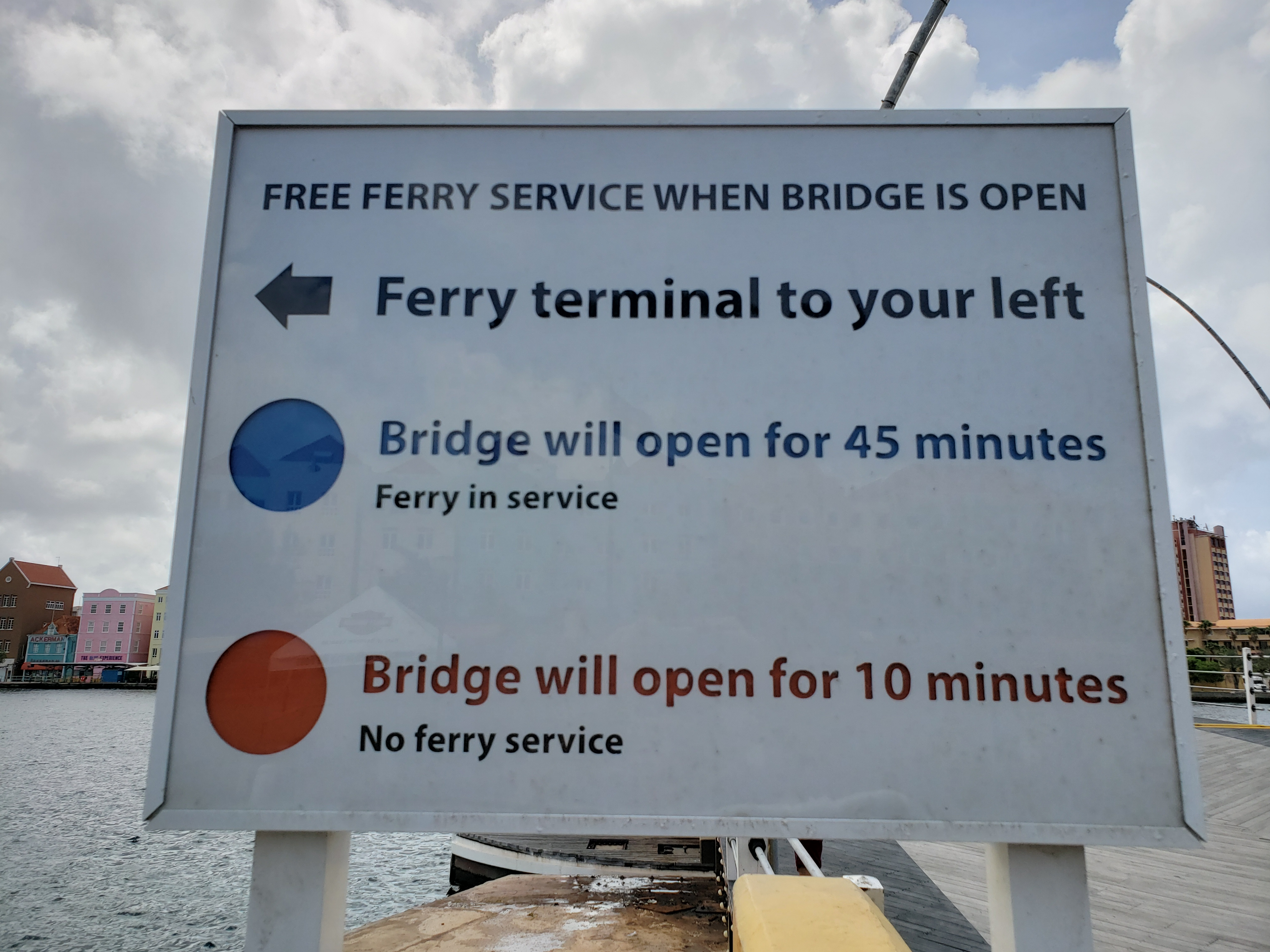
Queen Emma Bridge signals explanation

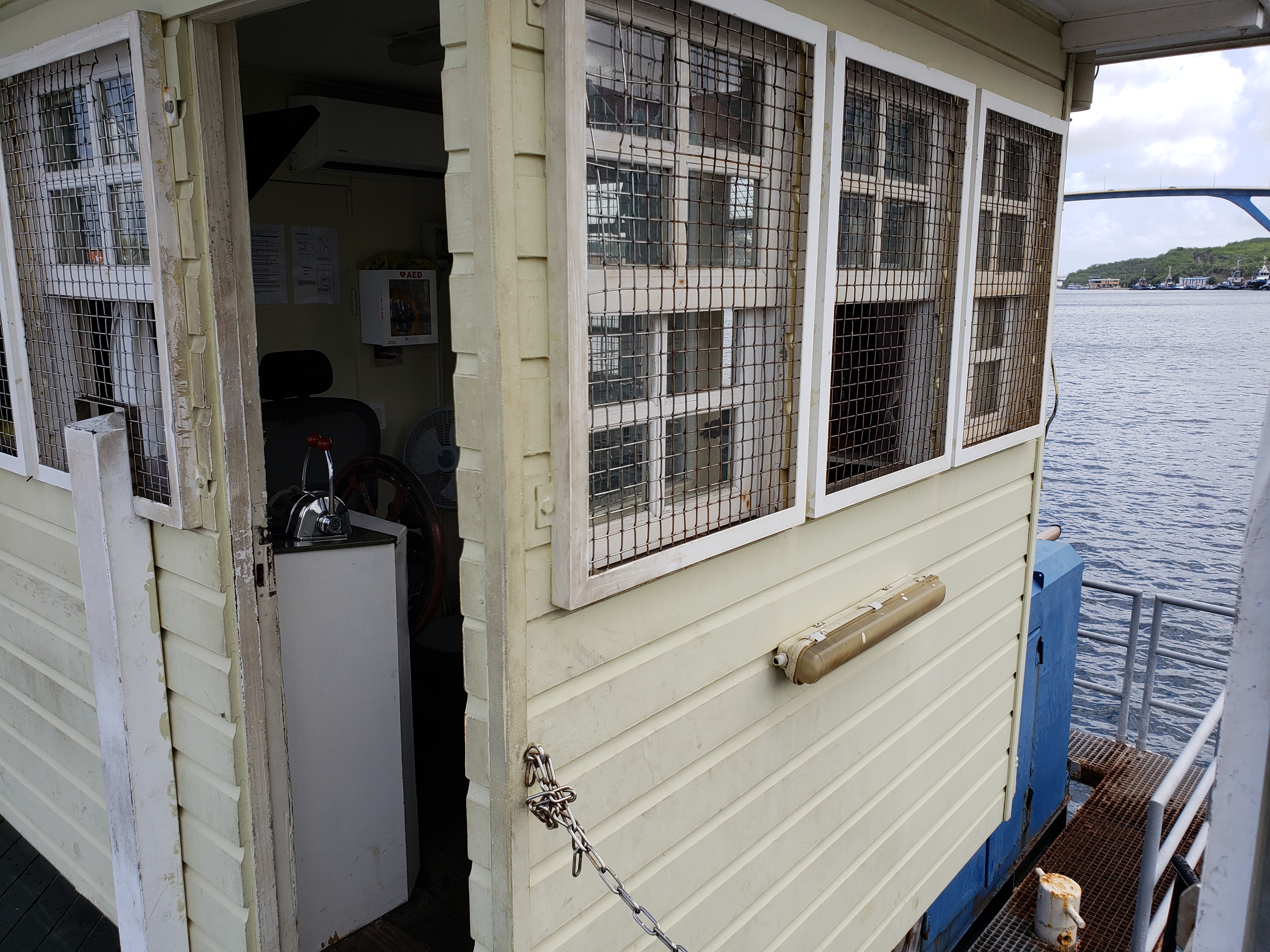
Queen Emma Bridge operator's cabin

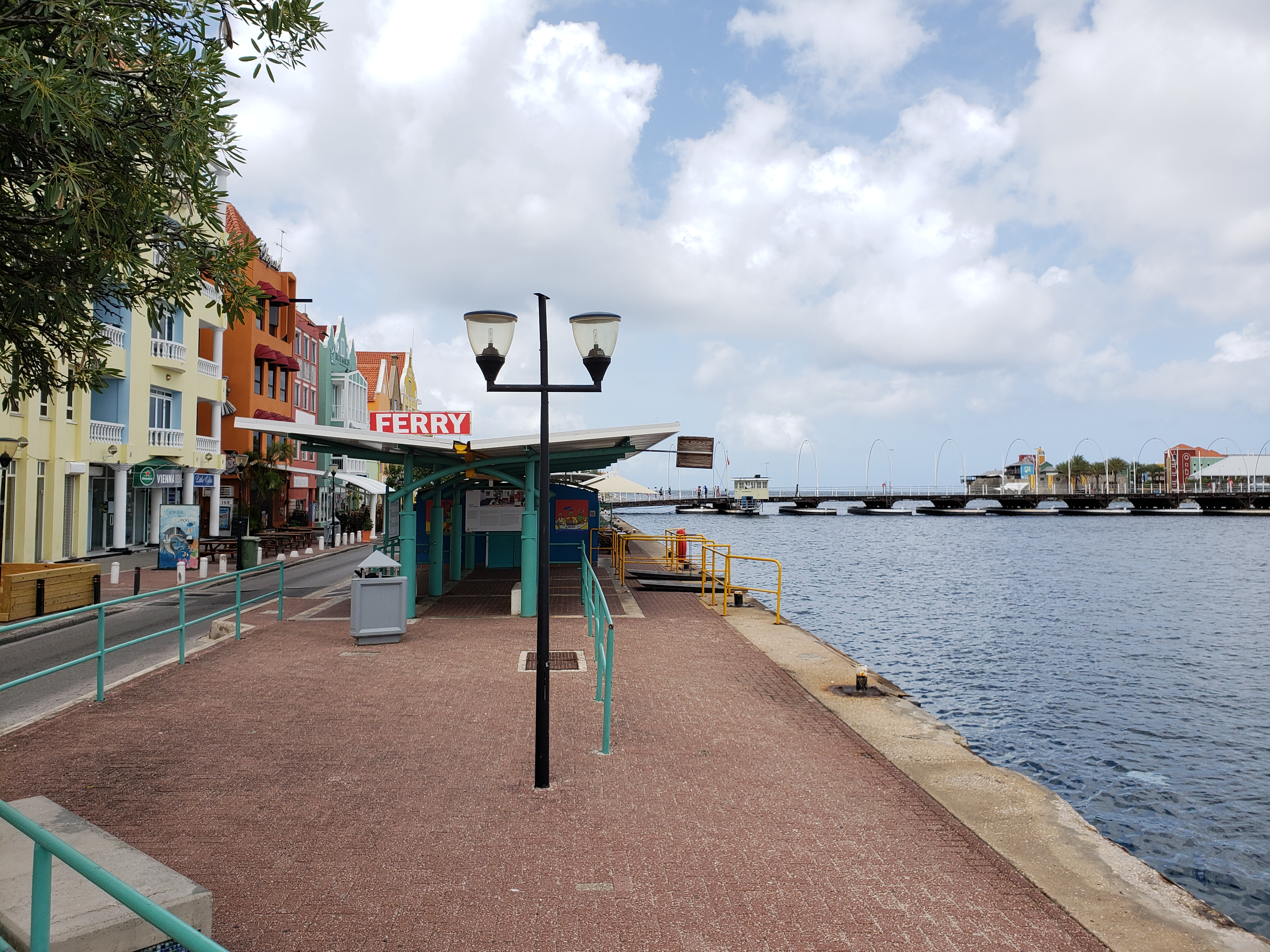
View of ferry station and Queen Emma Bridge with operator's cabin on the left

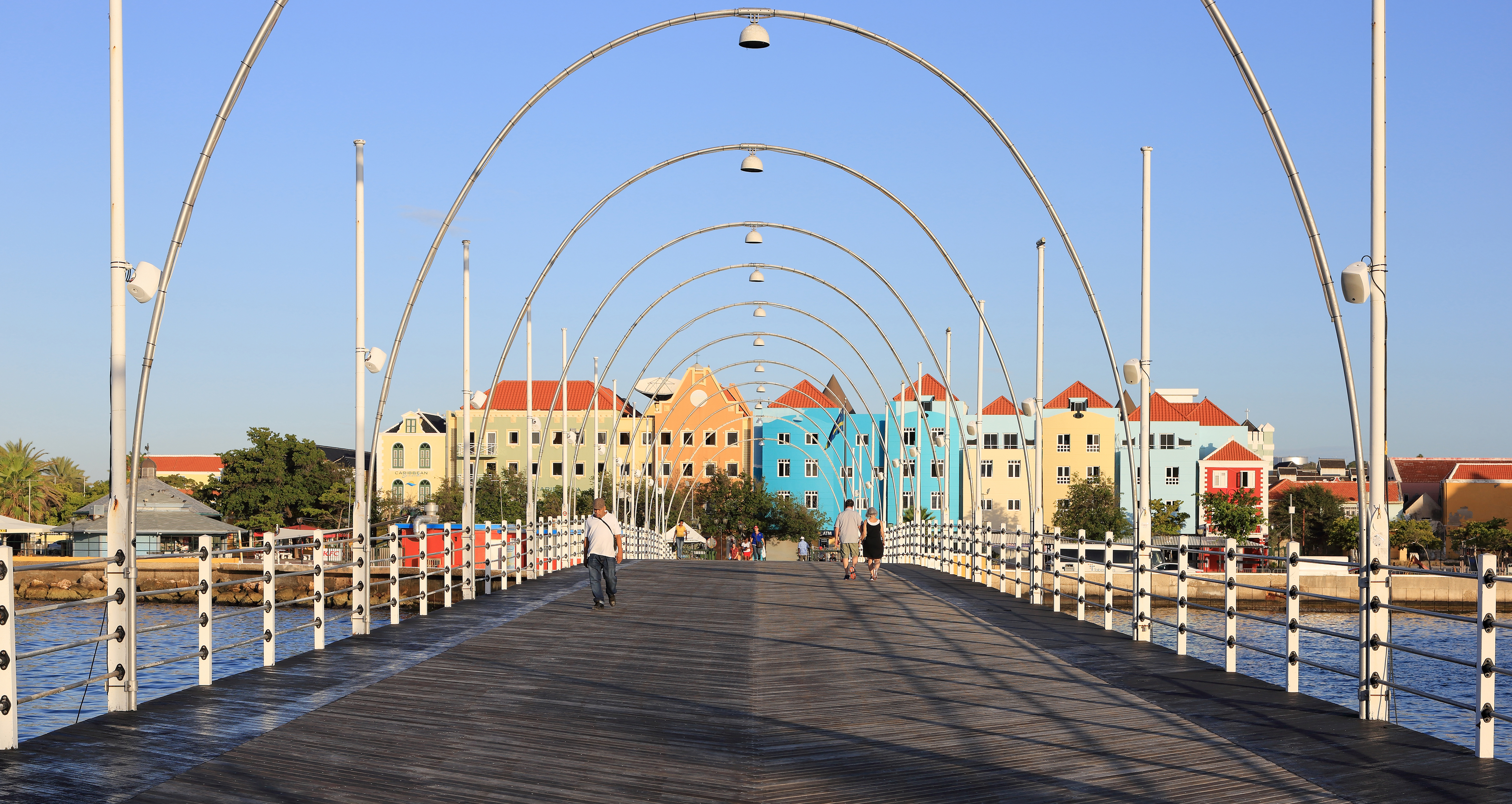
View of Otrobanda from Queen Emma Bridge

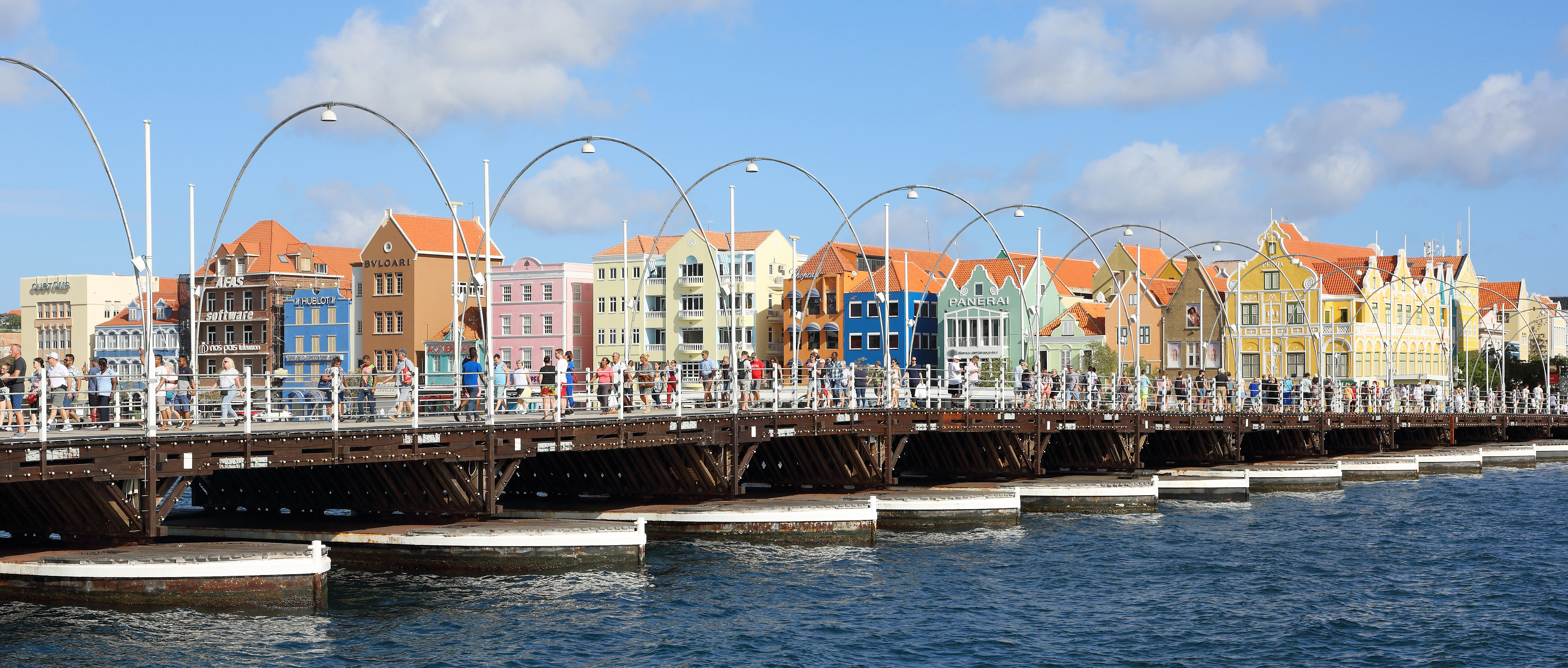
View of Punda with Queen Emma Bridge

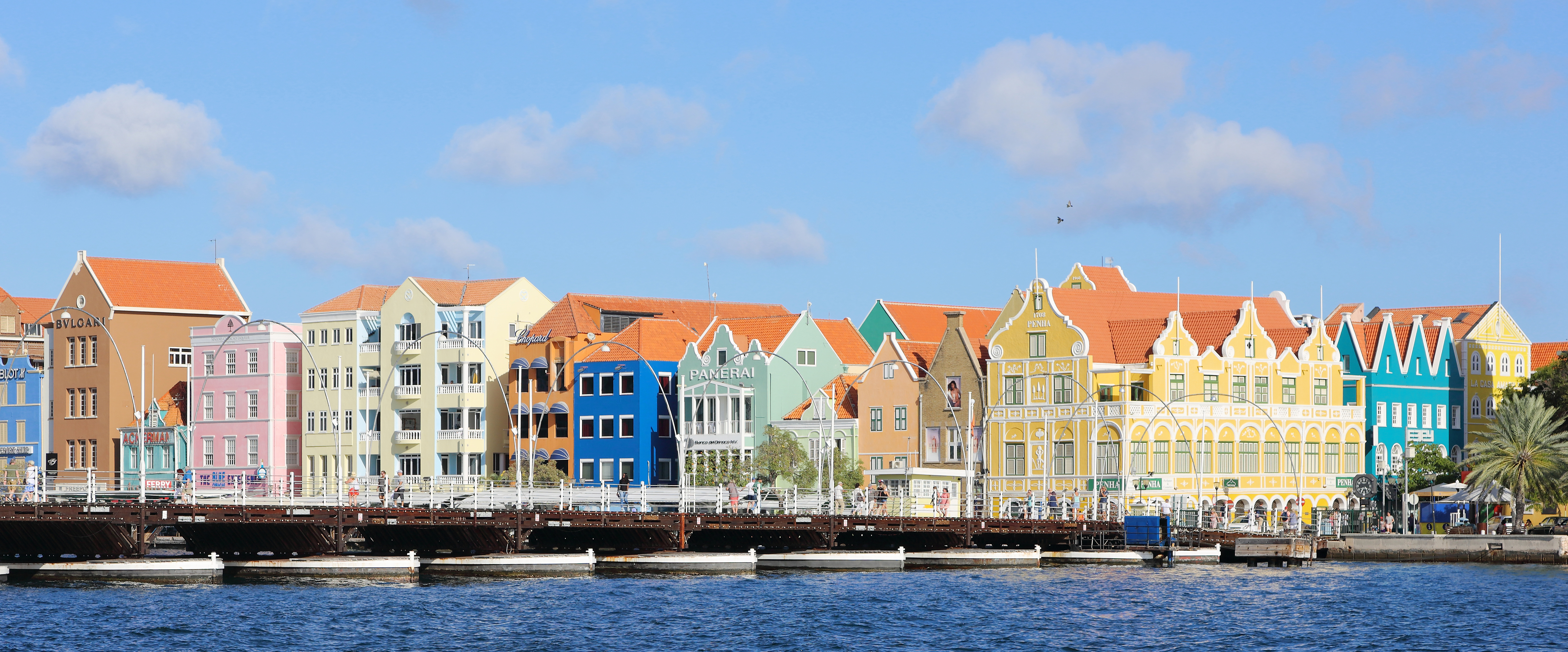
View of Handelskade with Queen Emma Bridge
