= Kurá Hulanda Museum =

Museum in Willemstad, Curaçao

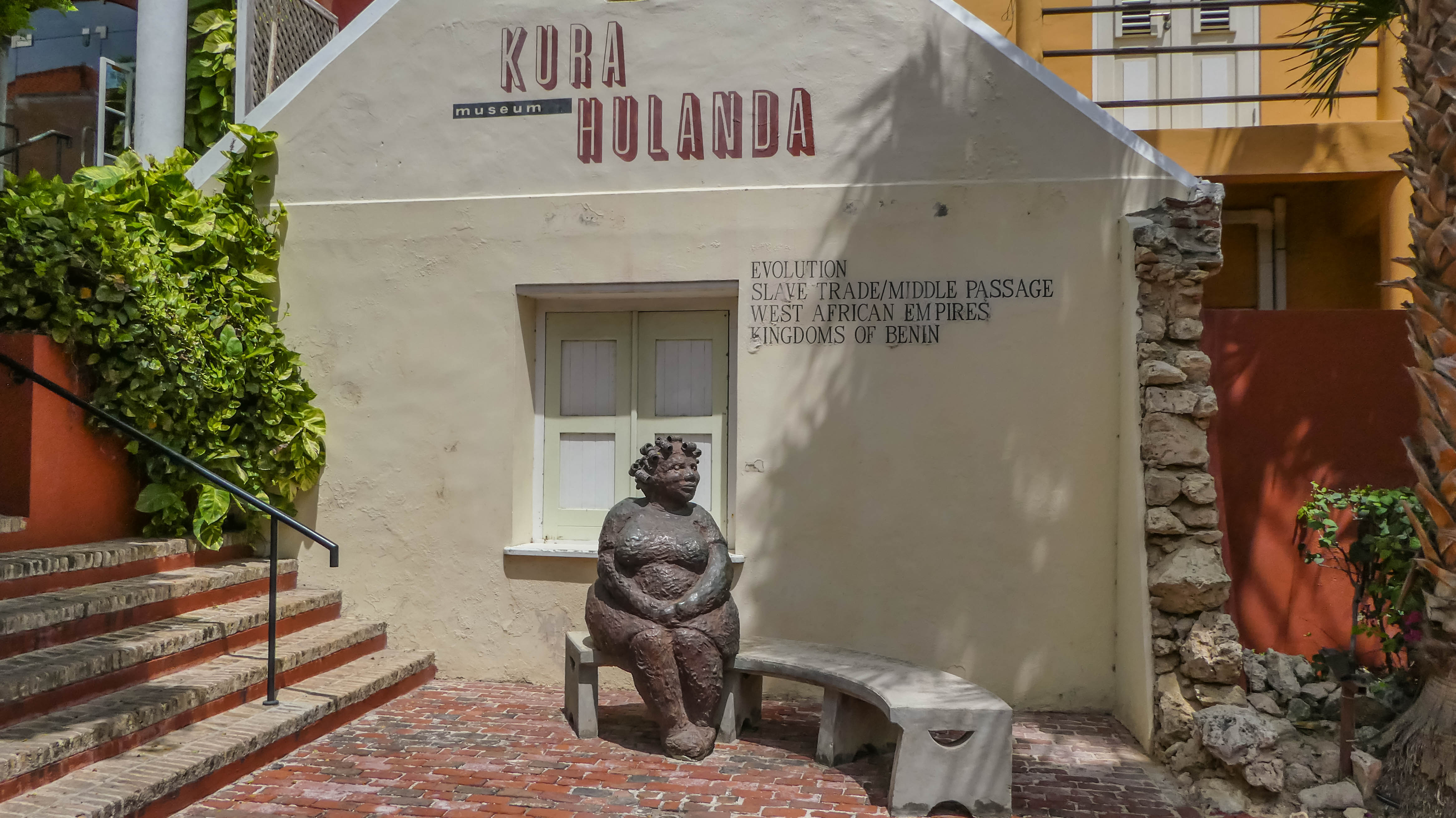
- Big Mama, statue by Hortence Brouwn in front of the museum

- Location within Curaçao
- Established: April 1999
- Location: Klipstraat 9, Otrobanda, Willemstad, Curaçao
- Coordinates: 12.10801°N 68.93562°W
- Website: kurahulanda.com

The Kurá Hulanda Museum is an anthropological museum located in the Kura Hulanda Village district of Willemstad, Curaçao. The museum teaches about the Atlantic slave trade, and African history in the Caribbean, and was opened in April 1999 by Jacob Gelt Dekker.

== History ==
The Kurá Hulanda Museum was an initiative of Dutch entrepreneur Jacob Gelt Dekker. In the late 1990s, he was approached by the Government of Curaçao to develop the western quayside in Otrobanda where historically the slave ships arrived with slaves to be sold at the nearby slave market. Dekker decided to buy the derelict buildings on the quay and market, restore the buildings to their original condition, and open a museum at the site specialising in the Atlantic slave trade and African history in the Caribbean.

The museum opened in April 1999. It consists of 15 buildings, covering an area of 16,000²ft displaying the history from the capture in Africa to the relocation in the Americas. It also displays the cultural heritage of the slaves on the culture of Curaçao in particular and the Caribbean in general.

== Hotel ==
Dekker bought most of the buildings on the hillside, and opened the luxury Kurá Hulanda Hotel & Lodge next to the museum. The hotel was declared bankrupt in October 2013. In 2019, the hotel was purchased by BMG management, and they took over the hotel in 2021. The hotel was closed for a year for refurbishment, although the museum remained operational during that time. Sadly Dekker died in 2019 before the sale was completed.
