= Curaçao Medical Center =

Hospital in Curaçao

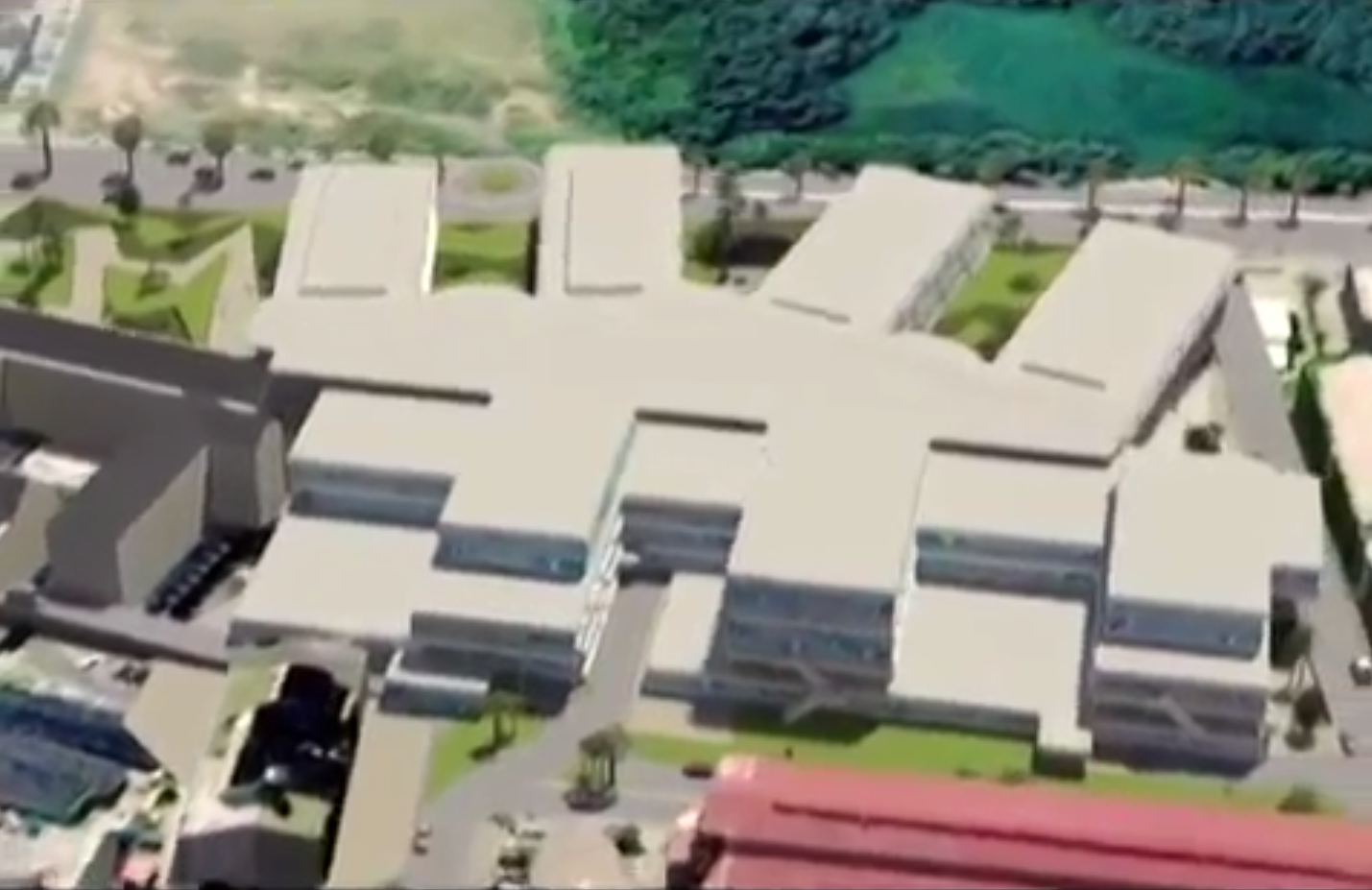
- Model of the Curaçao Medical Center

Geography
- Location: Otrobanda, Willemstad, Curaçao
- Coordinates: 12.10982°N 68.94238°W

Services
- Beds: 300

History
- Founded: 15 November 2019

Links
- Website: cmc.cw
- Lists: Hospitals in Curaçao

Curaçao Medical Center is the main hospital of Curaçao. It is located in the Otrobanda district of Willemstad, and serves a replacement for the Sint-Elisabeth Hospital. The hospital opened on 15 November 2019, and has been constructed next to the Sint-Elisabeth Hospital. As of 2021, the hospital has 300 beds, and a staff of 1,170 people.

== History ==
The main hospital of Curaçao used to be the Sint-Elisabeth Hospital which also had a regional function for speciality care for the other islands of the Dutch Antilles. The hospital was constructed in 1855, and was no longer up to international standards. In 2011, it was decided to construct a new hospital next to the existing hospital. The Curaçao Medical Center opened on 15 November 2019, and all the existing patients were moved to the new hospital. The hospital was fully operational in one week.
