= Plaza Hotel Curaçao =

Hotel in Curaçao

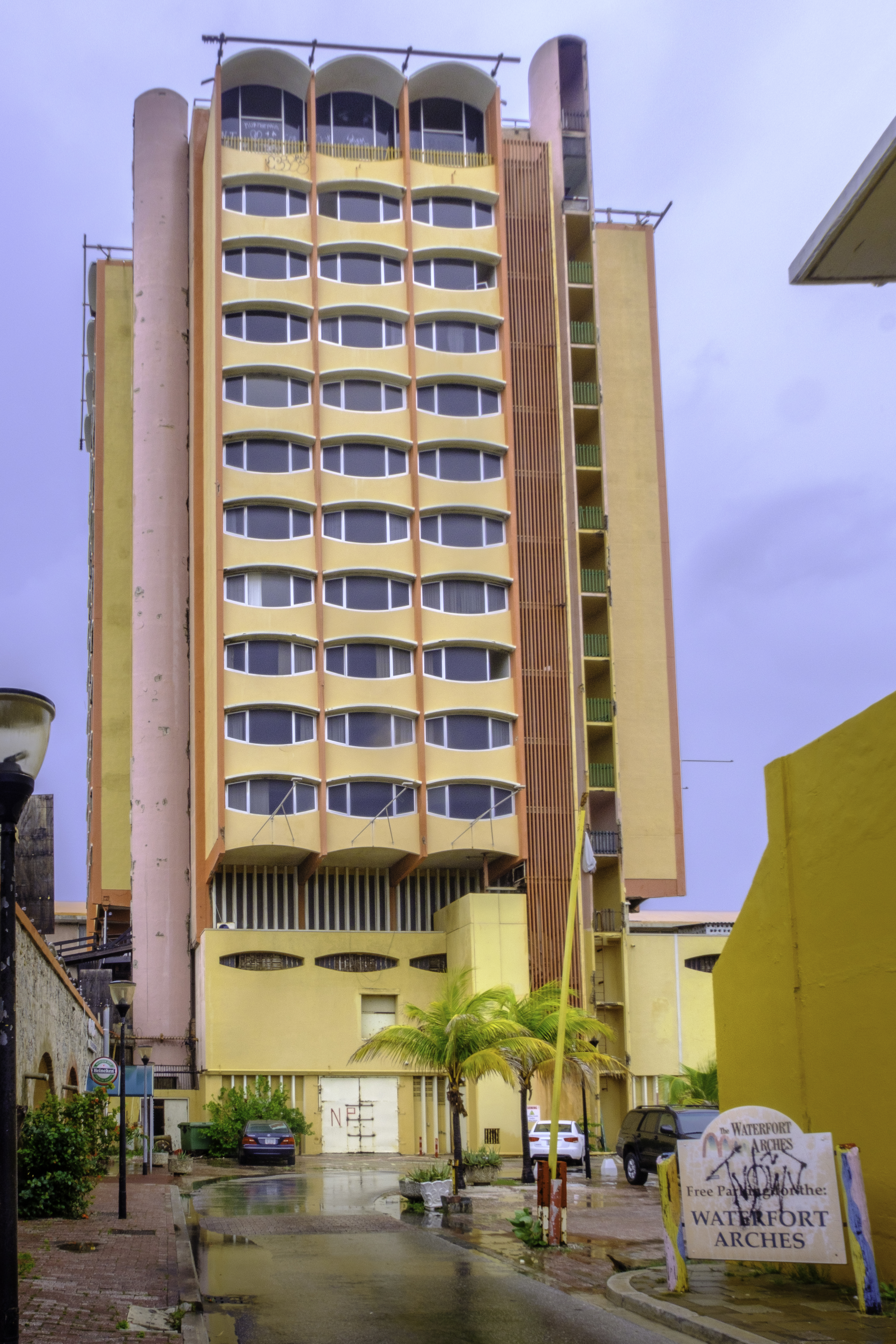
- Plaza Hotel Curaçao (2020)

- Location within Curaçao
- Alternative names: Hotel Curacao Intercontinental

General information
- Location: Waterfortstraat, Willemstad, Curaçao
- Coordinates: 12°06′14″N 68°56′06″W
- Opened: 12 October 1957
- Owner: InterContinental (1955–1976); Canadian Pacific (1976–1984); Hart Group (1984–1989); Van der Valk (1989–2006); Barney Ivanovic (2006–2017); Girobank (2017–2020); Alg. Pensioenfonds (2020–)

Height
- Height: 50 m (160 ft)

Technical details
- Floor count: 14

Design and construction
- Architects: Joseph P. Salerno and Ben Smit

Other information
- Number of rooms: 258

Plaza Hotel Curaçao is a former hotel in Willemstad, Curaçao. It was constructed in the Waterfort, and opened on 12 October 1957 as Hotel Curaçao Intercontinental. It is the tallest building on the island. The hotel has changed ownership many times. In 2017, Plaza Hotel Management was declared bankrupt. The hotel is in a dilapidated state, and pieces have fallen off. Viva Construction had been hired to assess the building prior to the 2020 auction, and reported that demolition was the best option. At the auction, it was sold to Algemeen Pensionfonds Curaçao, a pension fund which planned to redevelop the site.

== History ==
In 1953, the government of Curaçao was approached by the International Hotel Corporation who wanted to construct a large hotel on the island. In 1955, a model of the hotel was submitted for approval. A decision was reached to redevelop the area around the Waterfort, a fort constructed in 1634 and rebuilt in 1827. In July 1955, El Curaçao N.V. was founded. The site where the hotel would be built was occupied by the Netherlands Marine Corps who were relocated to Marinebasis Parera in late 1955. The hotel was constructed in the old fort.

=== Intercontinental ===
On 12 October 1957, Hotel Curaçao InterContinental opened. At the opening ceremony KLM announced direct flights from New York City to Curaçao. In 1968, an extension of the hotel was announced. A tower of 14 floors would be added to the hotel, and the total number of hotel rooms would be increased to 258. The tower was finished in 1970, and was the tallest building in Curaçao; the second floor was dedicated to meetings, and the top floor contained a penthouse suite. As of 2022, it still is the tallest building. InterContinental decided to terminate the contract at the end of 1976, and negotiations with Canadian Pacific Hotels started.

=== Canadian Pacific ===
Canadian Pacific demanded loans and large investments of the island government. On 2 September 1976, the hotel was purchased, and renamed Plaza Hotel Curaçao. The headquarters of Canadian Pacific for Latin America and the Caribbean were moved to Curaçao, and Air Canada announced that it would commence charter flights to Curaçao. In 1981, large losses were reported, and the hotel only managed to keep afloat on the casino and subsidies from the island government. In 1983, Canadian Pacific started negotiations with the Hart Hotel Group.

=== Hart Group ===
In June 1984, the hotel was sold to the Hart Group, a joint venture of Richard Hart and Ramada Hotels. The hotel was renovated, and a discotheque was added. The renovated hotel reopened in December 1986, and Richard Hart expressed confidence that it would be profitable. In January 1989, the island government, which had acquired a 32% share in the hotel in 1981, announced its intention to sell its share.

=== Van der Valk ===
In March 1989, the hotel was sold to Van der Valk Hotels for US$3 million. The island government promised to spend US$150,000 annually on the promotion of the hotel, and Richard Hart would remain president of the hotel. Van der Valk wanted to expand the hotel with an artificial beach, however the negotiations with the island government were difficult, and environmental groups demonstrated against further destruction of the coral reef. Van der Valk complained that they were one of the few hotels on the island without a private beach.

=== Barney Ivanovic ===
In 2006, the Plaza Hotel was sold to Barney Ivanovic, a Yugoslavian-born American businessman. In 2008, a dispute arose between Ivanovic and his business partner Chester Peterson about the ownership of the hotel, and Ivanovic was forcibly removed from the hotel. A lengthy legal battle followed. In 2011, Ivanovic sued Adèle van der Pluijm-Vrede, the notary at the time and acting Governor of the Netherlands Antilles, in a Florida court. Van der Pluijm-Vrede refused to appear in court citing costs and no time. The Florida judge dismissed the charges as not related to Florida. Girobank was the mortgage holder of the hotel. By 2017, Plaza Hotel Management owed Girobank NAf 26 million (~US$14 million). Girobank went to court, and Plaza Hotel Management was declared bankrupt.

=== Aftermath ===
In June 2017, the Plaza Hotel was sold by auction to John W. Burcham of Waterfront Hotel Group for US$9 million who planned to open a Hilton DoubleTree hotel; however, the money was never paid. In 2018, it was sold to Tom Bolera for NAf 13.5 million (~US$7.5 million), but he never paid either. In September 2020, the hotel was sold to Algemeen Pensionfonds Curaçao, a pension fund, for NAf 6.3 million (~US$3.5 million).

Years of neglect combined with vandalism have resulted in a dilapidated state. Concrete degradation has caused fallen debris, and experts have recommended that the building should be fenced off. Viva Construction had been hired to assess the building prior to the 2020 auction, and reported that demolition was the best option.

== Gallery ==
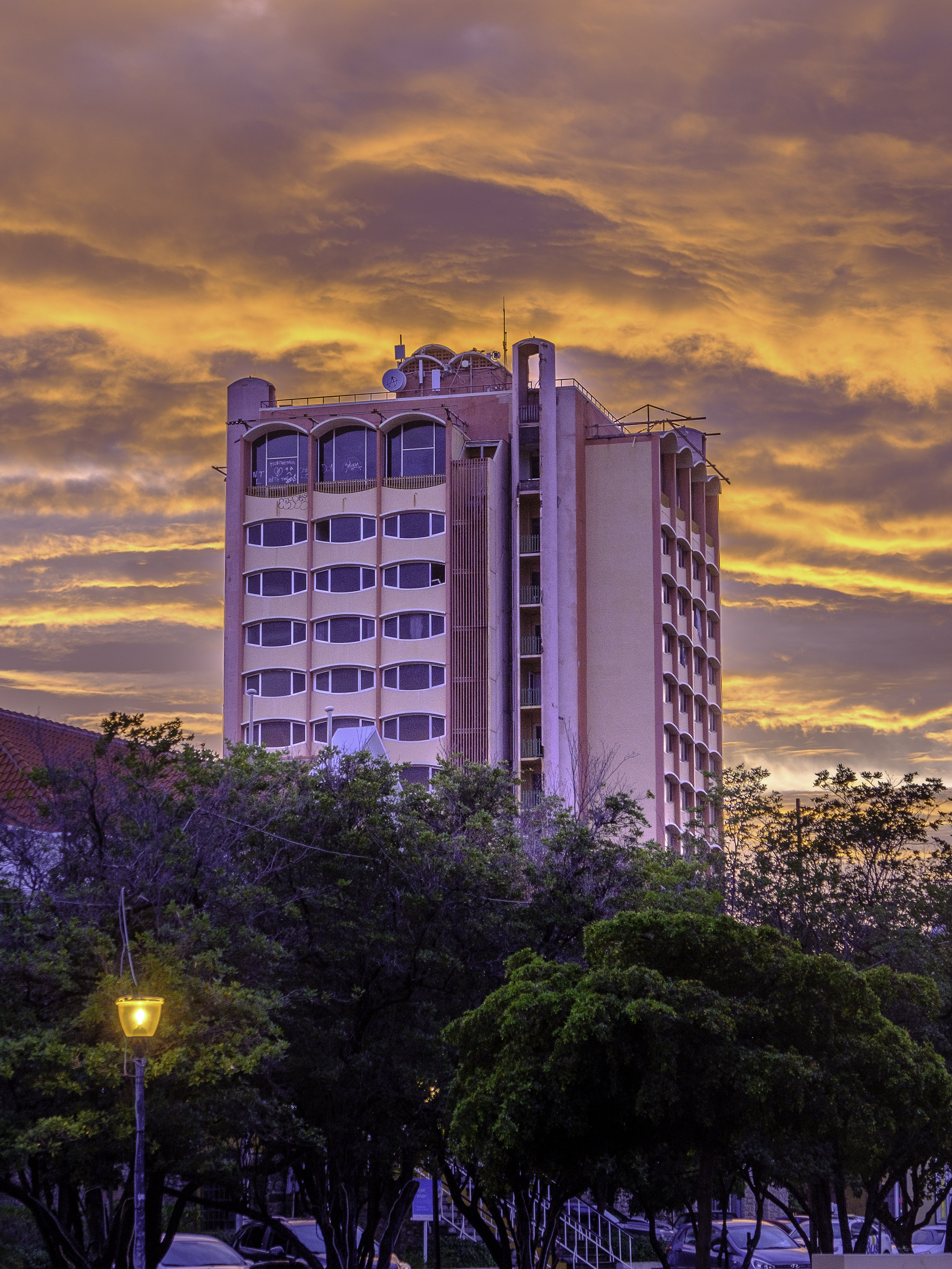
Plaza Hotel at sunset

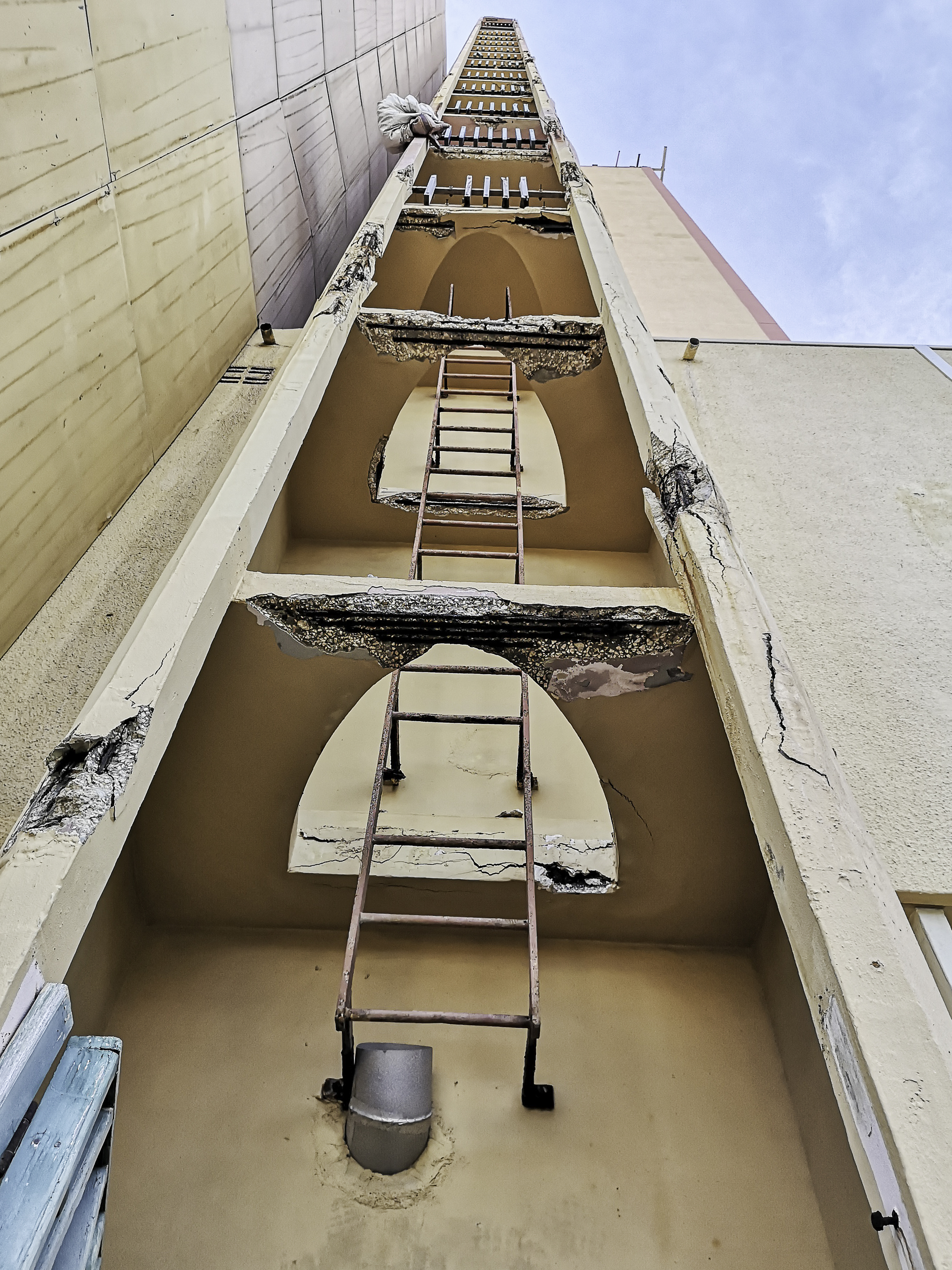
The fire escape (2020)

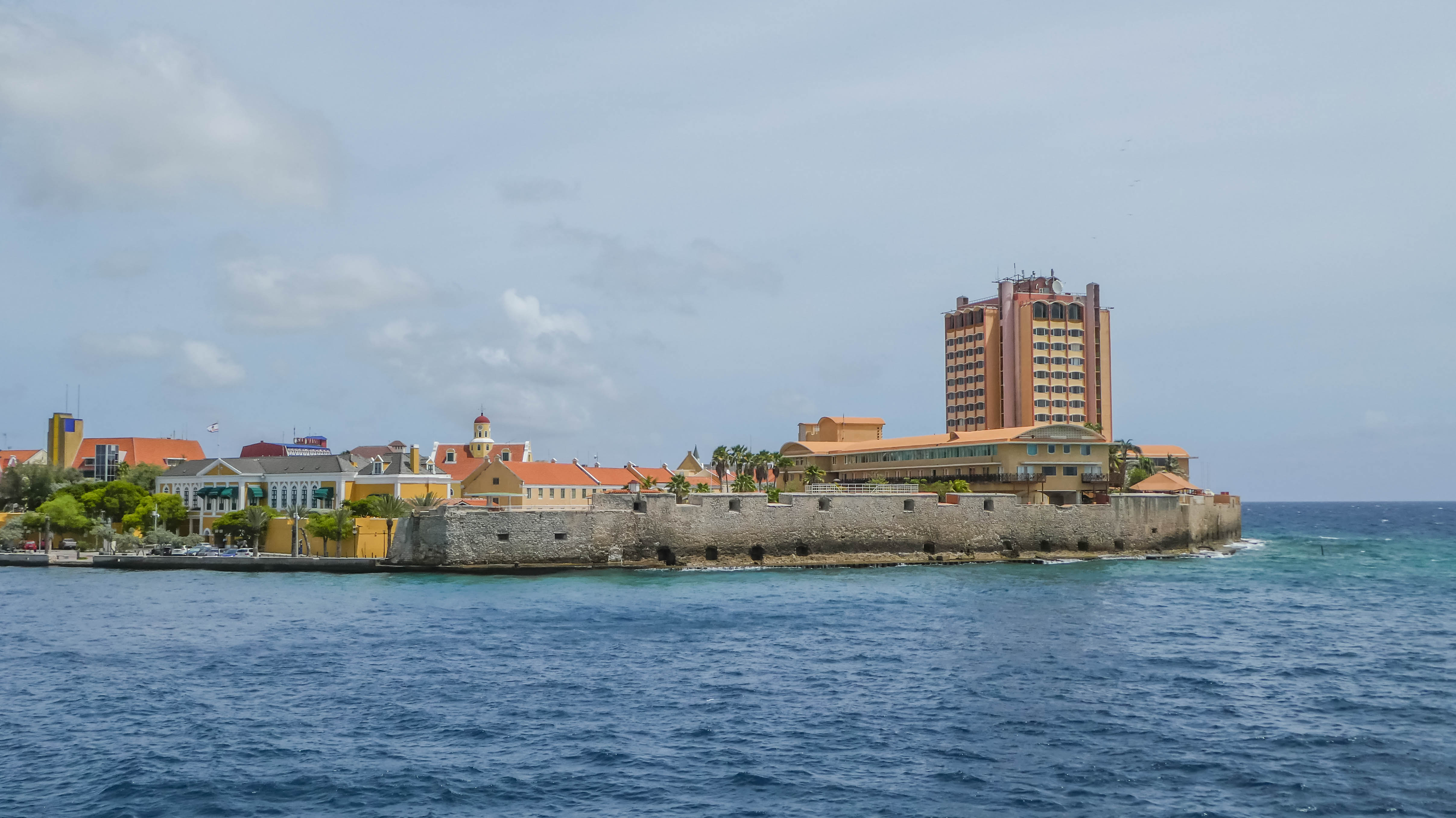
Plaza Hotel on the Waterfort

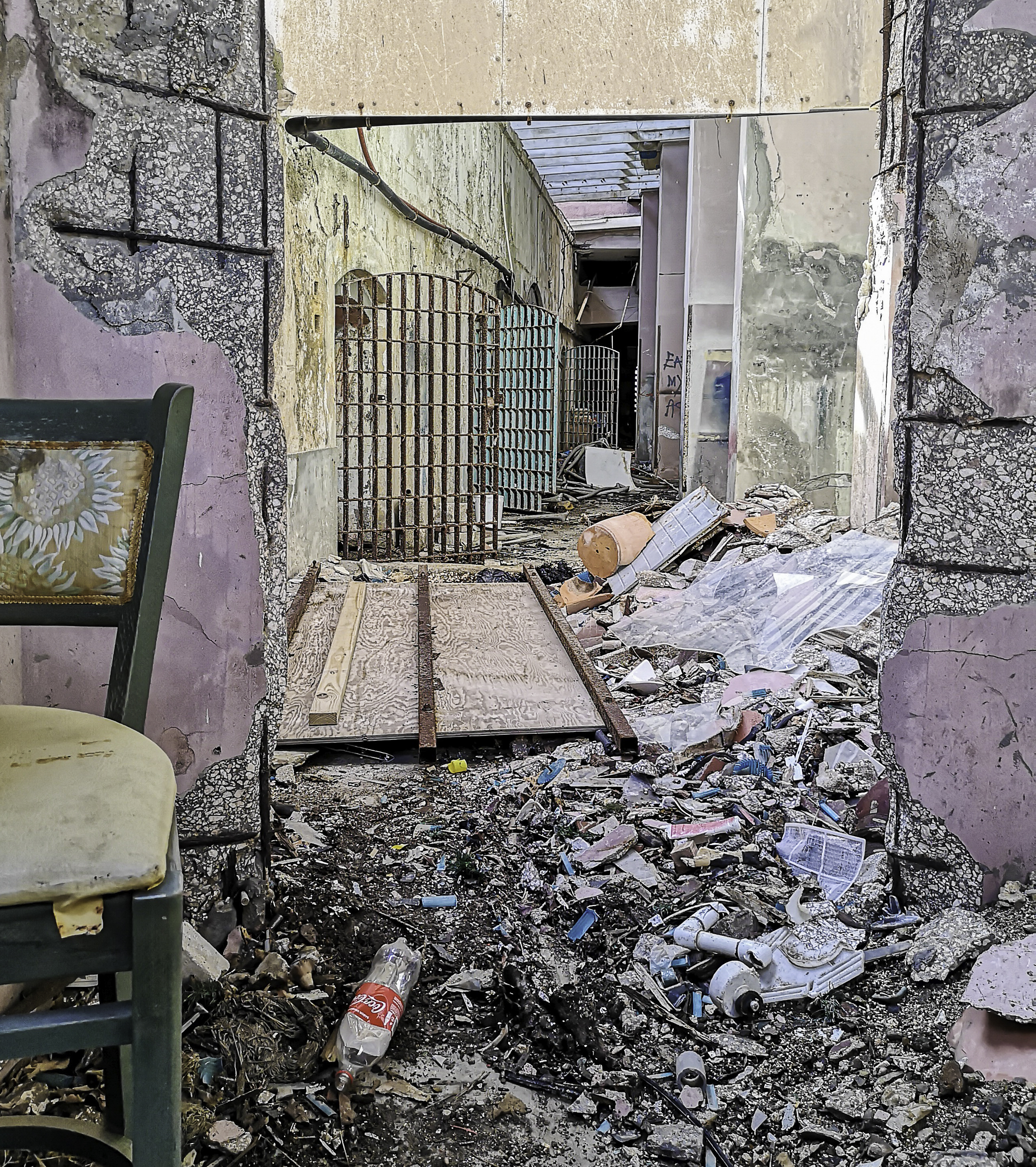
Inside the hotel (2020)
