= Oterleek =

- Village
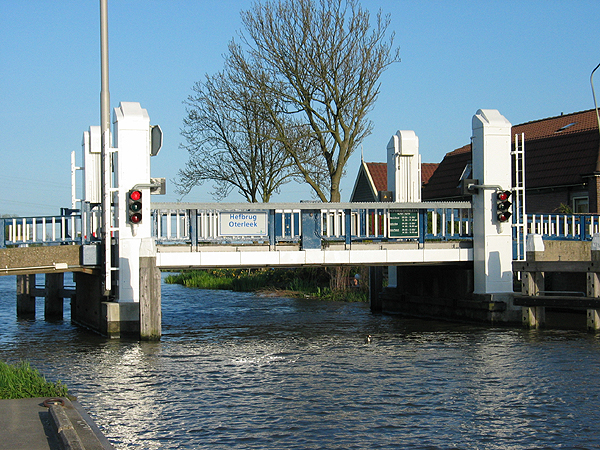
- Vertical-lift bridge

- Coat of arms

- Location in the Netherlands Location in the province of North Holland in the Netherlands
- Coordinates: 52°38′N 4°50′E
- Country: Netherlands
- Province: North Holland
- Municipality: Alkmaar

Area
  - Total: 10.05 km^{2} (3.88 sq mi)
- Elevation: −2.1 m (−6.9 ft)

Population (2021)
  - Total: 635
  - Density: 63.2/km^{2} (164/sq mi)
- Time zone: UTC+1 (CET)
  - Summer (DST): UTC+2 (CEST)
- Postal code: 1842
- Dialing code: 072

Oterleek is a village in the Dutch province of North Holland. It is a part of the municipality of Alkmaar, and lies about 4 km south of Heerhugowaard.

== History ==
The village was first mentioned in 1256 as Oterleke, and is a combination of "outwards" and "natural stream". Oterleek developed on the old land outside of the dike of Heerhugowaard which was poldered between 1629 and 1631. Before the Schermer and the Heerhugowaard were polder, the village was located on an island between the two lakes. In 1573, the village was burnt by Diederik Sonoy for conspiring with the Spanish.

A large part of the village burnt down 1922. There are three polder mills and one grist mill in Oterleek.

Oterleek was home to 230 people in 1840. It was a separate municipality between 1817 and 1970, when it was merged with Schermer. In 2015, it became part of the municipality of Alkmaar.

== People from Oterleek ==
- Jacob Gelt Dekker (1948-2019), dentist by trade, entrepreneur, and author of The Caribbean [Amsterdam Publishers, 2018].

== Gallery ==
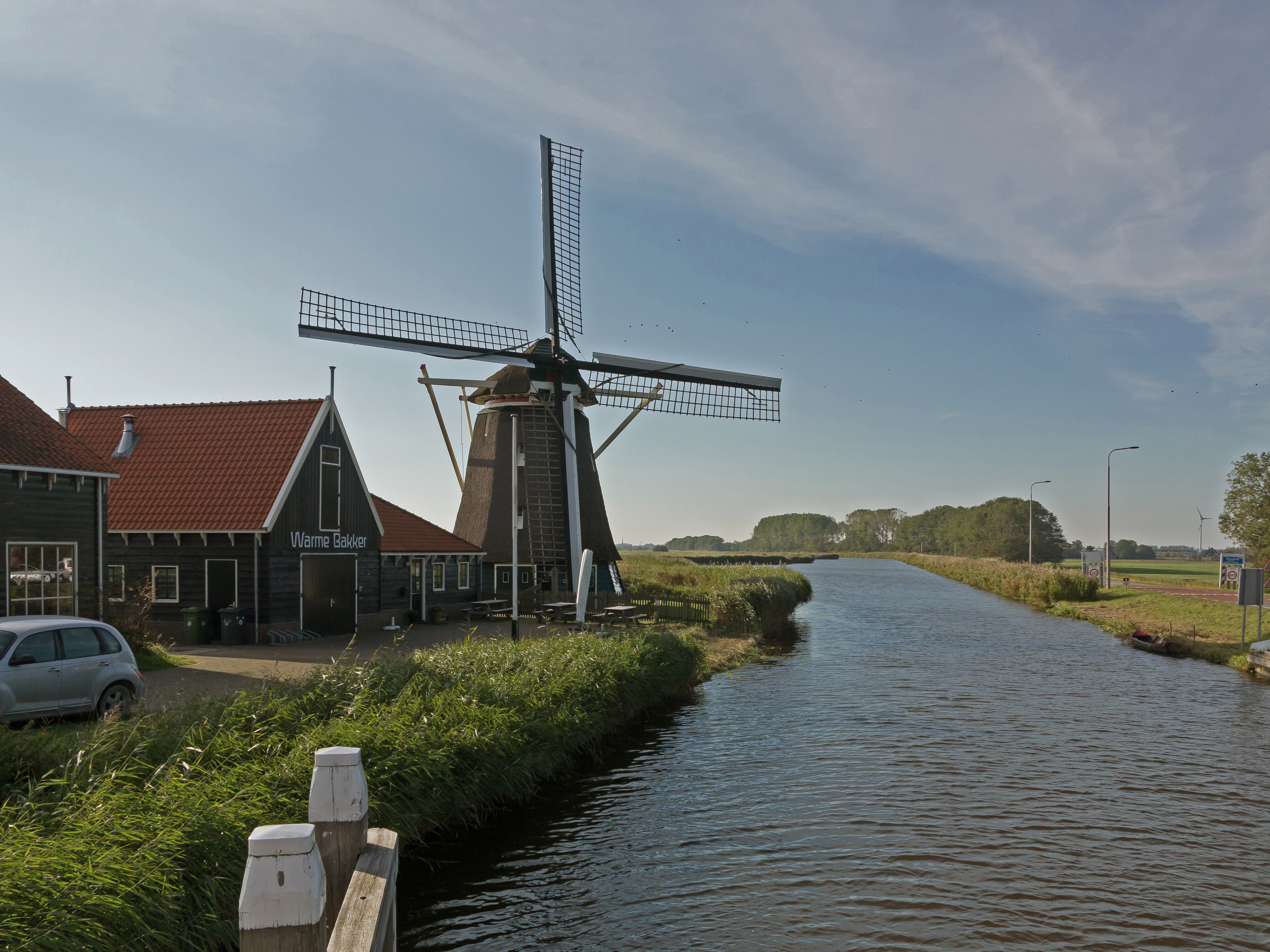
Windmill: korenmolen De Otter

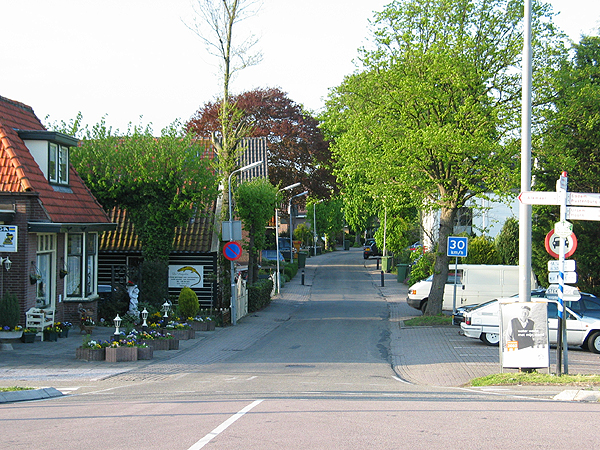
Street view
