= Sint-Elisabeth Hospital =

Hospital on the island of Curaçao

Coordinates: 12.1092°N 68.9391°W

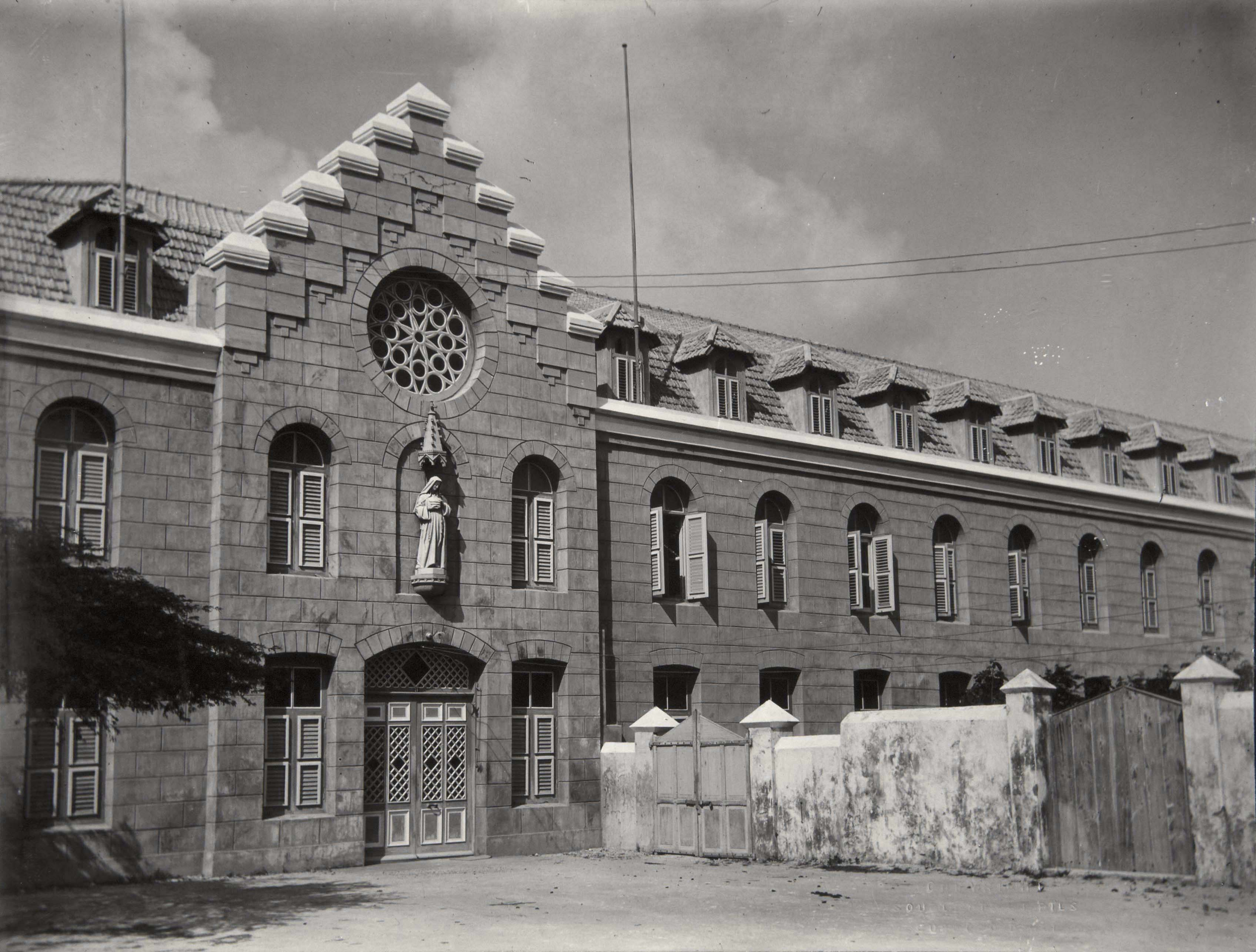
Sint-Elisabeth Gasthuis between 1915 and 1920

Sint-Elisabeth Hospital was the main hospital on Curaçao, located in the Otrobanda district of Willemstad. It closed in November 2019, and was replaced by the Curaçao Medical Center. Part of the hospital will be demolished.

The contract for construction of the new hospital was led and managed by Stichting Ontwikkeling Nederlandse Antillen (Foundation for the Development of the Netherlands Antilles). The costs of running the hospital will be higher because it will have more staff (about 1260) and have to meet management costs and depreciation which it did not do before.

== Facilities ==
The Sint-Elisabeth Hospital had 500 beds, a decompression chamber and qualified staff to assist scuba divers suffering from decompression sickness. There was a kidney dialysis unit.

== History ==
The first nursing home on the site, St. Elisabeth Gasthuis, was founded on 3 December 1855 by Monseigneur Ferdinand Eduard Cornelis Kieckens.
