= Otrobanda =

- Neighbourhood
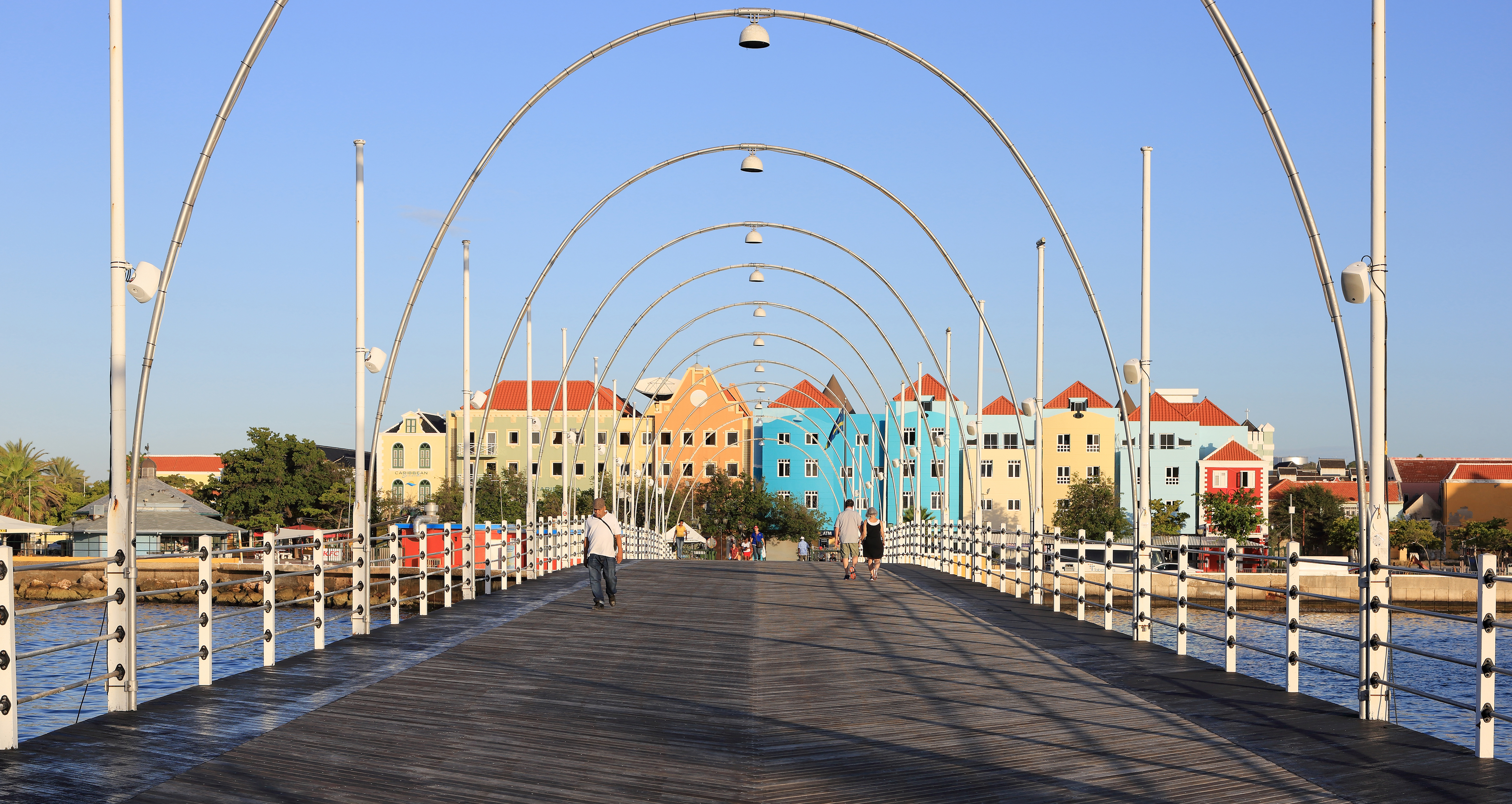
- View of Otrobanda from Queen Emma Bridge

- Location in Curaçao
- Coordinates: 12.109°N 68.937°W
- State: Kingdom of the Netherlands
- Country: Curaçao
- City: Willemstad

Population (2011)
  - Total: 1,369

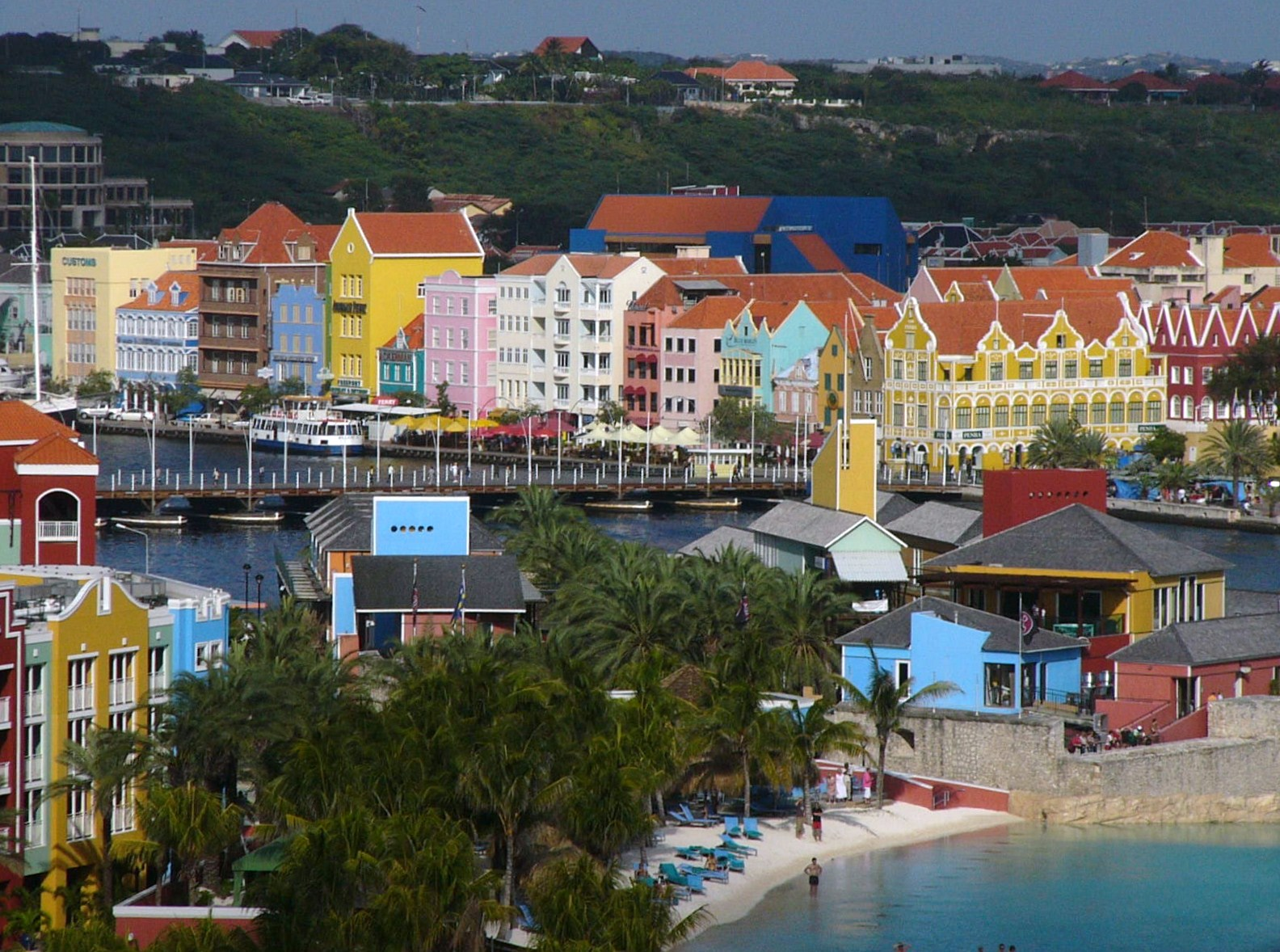
Otrobanda and Rif Fort are in the foreground, while the Queen Emma Bridge is the pontoon bridge in the center, with the colorful buildings of Willemstad in the background.

Otrobanda is one of the historic quarters of Willemstad, located at the southwest side of the city, in Curaçao, a Lesser Antilles island in the Dutch Caribbean. Otrobanda was founded in 1707, and has been designated a Unesco World Heritage Site.

== History ==
Otrobanda was founded in 1707 as a suburb of Willemstad on the other side of the Sint Anna Bay. Otrobanda was often referred to as the Spanish side, and Punda and Pietermaai were called the Holland side. In 1752, In 1816, the population of Otrobanda was 2,527 people. In 1856, the Sint-Elisabeth Hospital, the first hospital of the country, was opened in Otrobanda. In 2019, it was replaced by Curaçao Medical Center which was built next to the old hospital. The Basilica of St. Anne was built as the first Roman Catholic church on the island.

The district saw a rapid population increase up in the early 19th century when the once walled city of Willemstad became overpopulated. Otrobanda was connected to Punda in 1888 via the Queen Emma Bridge (affectionately known as "The Swinging Old Lady") and in 1974 by the Queen Juliana Bridge. The main center of Willemstad is separated in two quarters: Punda and Otrobanda, which stands for 'city' and 'the other side'.

Otrobanda is home to the Kurá Hulanda Museum, an anthropological museum specialising in the Atlantic slave trade. The museum is considered one of the best historical restorations in Otrobanda. The Curaçao Museum is located in the former military hospital of Otrobanda. It opened its doors on 7 March 1948, and contains a large collection of paintings, furniture, glass, and textile. It regularly organises exhibitions of local and national artists.

Many of the over 700 UNESCO listed buildings in Willemstad have been restored and/or renovated (on the inside) to serve as homes, shops, offices and accommodations like Poppy Hostel Curacao.

The restored area now shelters Rif Fort Village, a shopping and entertainment center that offers panoramic views of Punda and the sea. The Brionplein (Brion Plaza) is the centerpiece of Otrobanda's waterfront.

== Rif Fort ==
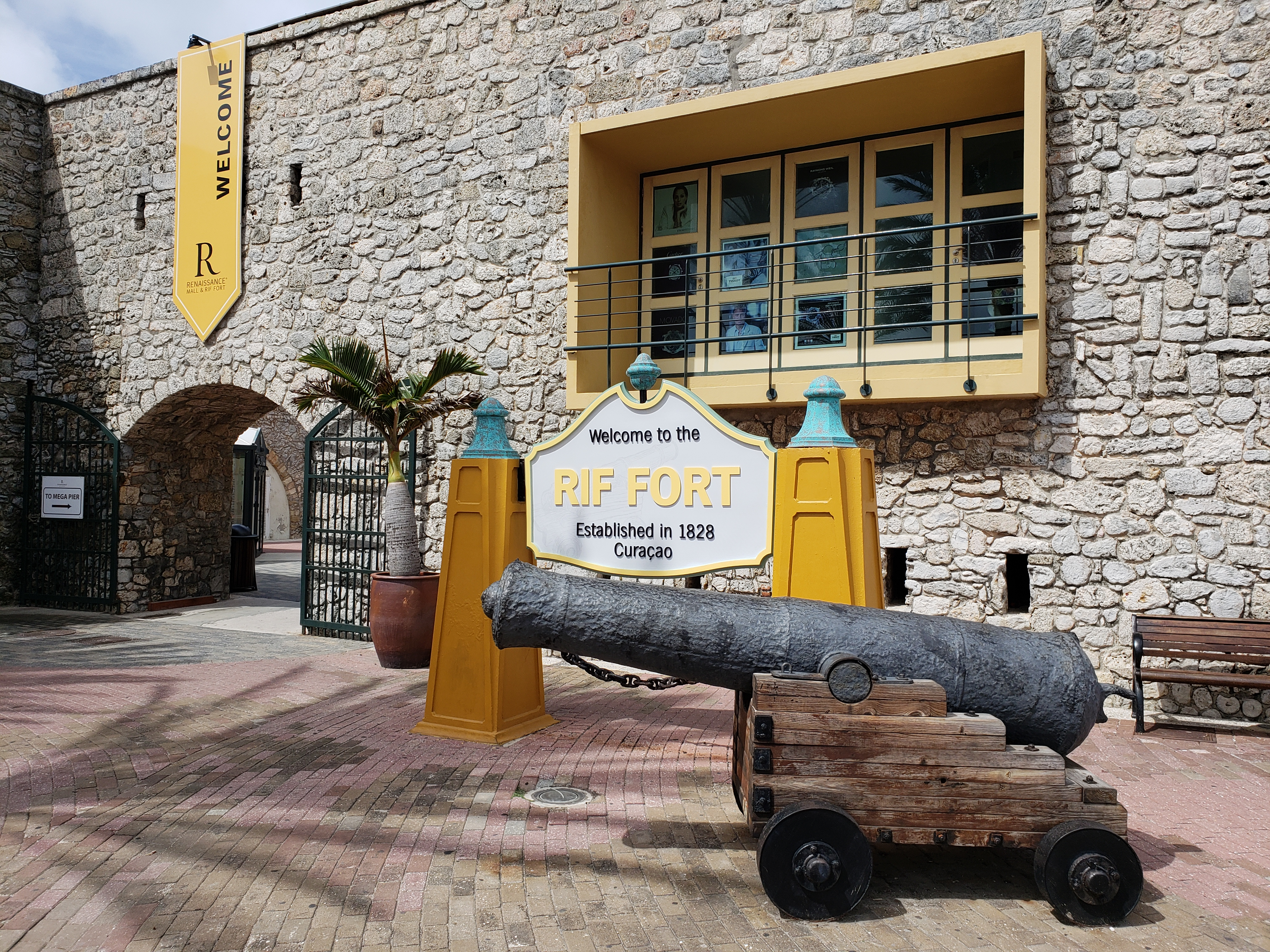
Rif Fort, Otrobanda

The Rif Fort is a 19th-century defense monument which was built to protect the island from the invasion of pirates and enemies. Its key location was centered in the heart of Curaçao. It lies at the entrance of the Sint Anna Bay in the western Otrobanda neighborhood. Rif Fort is made of 1.5-meter thick coral walls that once stored over 56 cannons. Today, Rif Fort is a tourist attraction that features great local restaurants, live entertainment, trendy bars with Latin and Caribbean music and the rough waves that smash through the ends of the walls. The Fort was redeveloped by the Renaissance Curaçao Resort and Casino. Locals and tourists visit this site frequently.

== Shops ==
The Renaissance shopping mall is a shopping center that is located across Rif Fort. Its features tall red buildings and bright green plants and a place for tourists to shop at; the shopping mall is home to more than 50 shops including various luxurious boutique shops.

== Bibliography ==
- Benjamins, Herman Daniël; Snelleman, Johannes (1917). Encyclopaedie van Nederlandsch West-Indië (in Dutch). Leiden: Martinus Nijhoff Publishers – via Digital Library for Dutch Literature.
