= Joseph P. Salerno =

American architect

Joseph P. Salerno (August 17, 1914 – April 3, 1981) was an American architect best known for several mid-century modern works done with the Inter-Continental Hotels Corporation and through his Westport, Connecticut–based firm.

Salerno was born in Chicago and graduated from the Yale School of Architecture. He was a student and admirer of Frank Lloyd Wright, and probably spent a summer apprenticing at Wright's Taliesin studio. His best known works include the Hotel Curaçao Inter-Continental in the Netherlands Antilles and the United Church of Rowayton (Rowayton, Connecticut), both of which won awards from the American Institute of Architects.
