= Sint Anna Bay =

Bay in Curaçao

Coordinates: 12.1097°N 68.9326°W

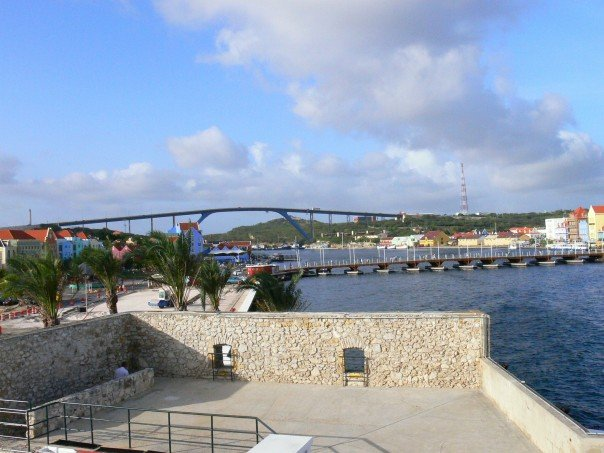
Sint Anna Bay

Sint Anna Bay (Dutch: Sint Annabaai; Papiamento: Bahia di Santa Ana) is a deep channel approximately one mile long and up to 1,000 feet wide, located on the island of Curaçao between the two parts of Willemstad, Punda and Otrobanda.

The bay opens into the Caribbean Sea at the southern end, and into the Schottegat lagoon/industrial area to the north.
