= Maduro (surname) =

Maduro is a surname most commonly associated with Nicolás Maduro (born 1962), president of Venezuela from 2013 to 2026.

Other notable people with the name include:

== Politicians ==
- Conrad Maduro (fl. 1967–present), British Virgin Islands politician and party leader
- Nicolás Maduro Guerra (born 1990), Venezuelan politician, son of Nicolás Maduro
- Ricardo Maduro (born 1946), former President of Honduras and chairman of the Central Bank of Honduras
- Xiomara Maduro (born 1974), Aruban politician and minister

== Athletes ==
- Calvin Maduro (born 1974), Aruban professional baseball player
- Clayon Maduro (born 1989), Aruban professional footballer
- Hedwiges Maduro (born 1985), Dutch footballer
- Ryan Maduro (born 1986), American professional soccer player
- Victor Maduro, Aruban judoka (judo athlete)

== Other ==
- George Maduro (1916–1945), Dutch World War II hero

== See also ==
- Bobby Maduro Miami Stadium, ballpark of Miami
- Stadion dr. Antoine Maduro, multi-use stadium in Curaçao
- Maduro & Curiel's Bank, a bank in Curaçao
- Maduro Holding, a conglomerate operating in the Dutch Caribbean
- Besto Maduro, one name for the Albillo grape
- Maduros, dish made with cooking banana
- Pastelon de Platano Maduros, Caribbean casserole
