= Pietermaai =

- Neighbourhood
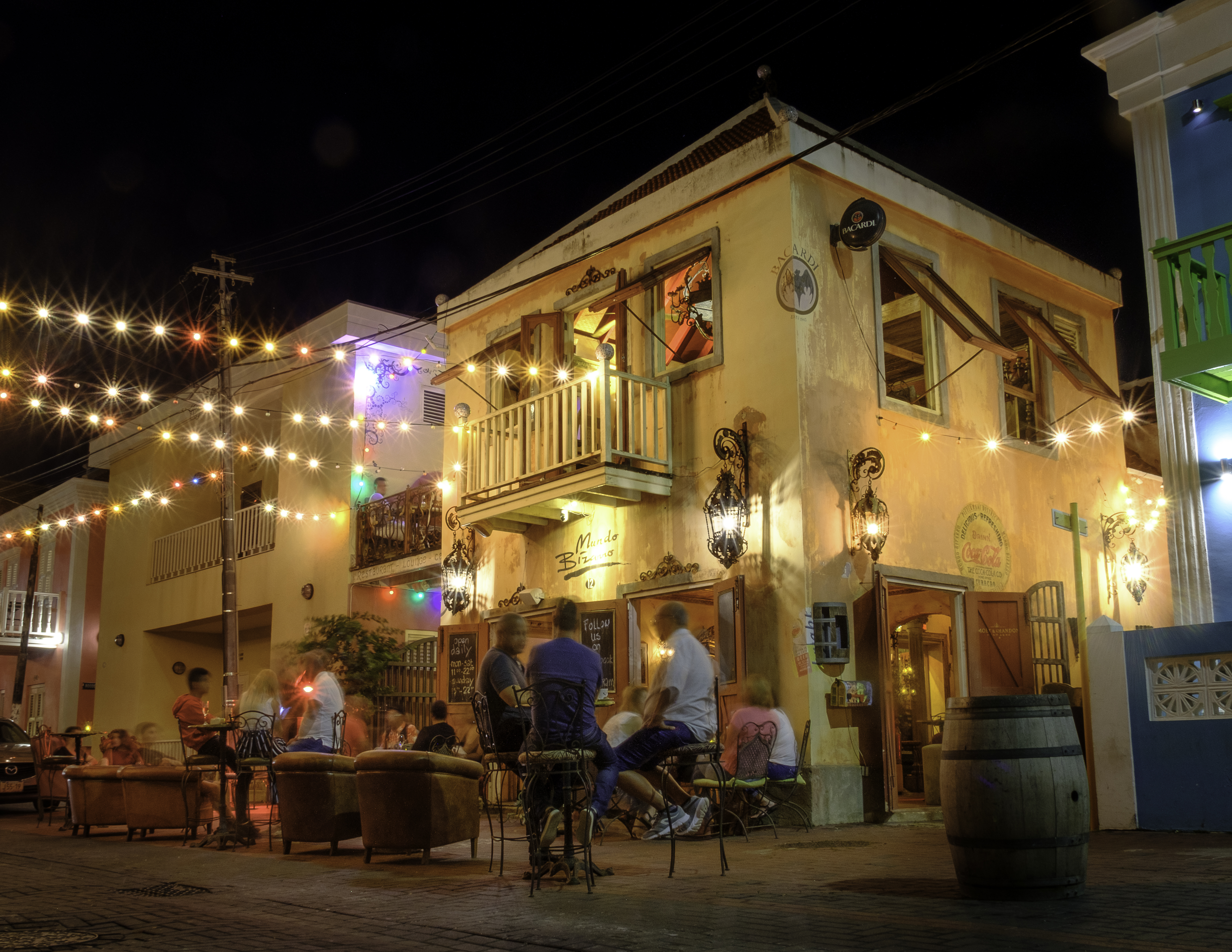
- The Nieuwestraat in Pietermaai (November 2020)

- Location in Curaçao
- Coordinates: 12.10300°N 68.92682°W
- State: Kingdom of the Netherlands
- Country: Curaçao
- City: Willemstad

Pietermaai is a neighbourhood and former suburb of Willemstad, on Curaçao, a Lesser Antilles island in the Dutch Caribbean. Pietermaai was founded in 1675, and has been designated a Unesco World Heritage Site.

== History ==
Willemstad, the capital of Curaçao, was constructed as a walled city. It soon developed into one of the major centres of the Atlantic slave trade which triggered a rapid population growth. In the late 17th century, there were over 200 houses within the city walls. In 1675, it was decided to construct the town of Pietermaai outside of the enclosed city. It was to be separated from the city by an area of about 500 metres in which construction was not allowed so as not to obstruct the cannons in Fort Amsterdam. The town was named after captain Pieter de Meij.

In 1707, the town of Otrobanda was established on the other side of Sint Anna Bay, and the suburb of Scharloo followed, however Willemstad continued to experience growth. By 1818, the population of Pietermaai had grown to 2,334 people. The population of Willemstad with suburbs was 9,536 people. On 13 May 1861, a decision was made to demolish the city walls, construct a wharf in the vacant area, and built residential houses in the gap separating Willemstad from Pietermaai. The concession for the project was awarded to S.E.L. Maduro of the Maduro family, the competitors of the Jesurun family who had a near monopoly on trade. A schism followed, resulting in the Jesurun family leaving the Mikvé Israel-Emanuel Synagogue and founding Tempel Emanu-el.

In 1870, the Queen of the Most Holy Rosary Cathedral was built for the parish of Pietermaai as a replacement of the old Gothic church. In 1958, it was designated as the only cathedral on the island.

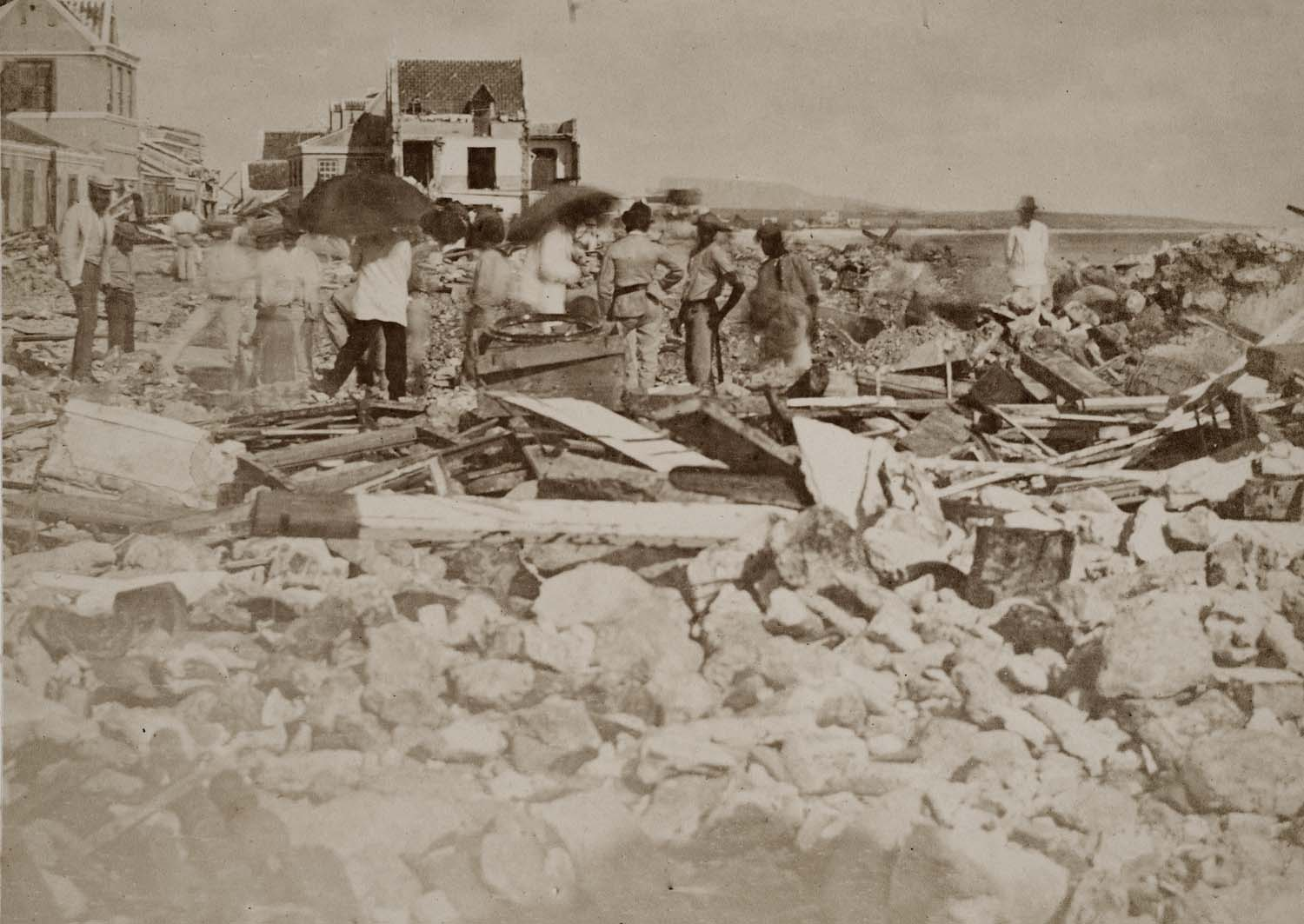
The ruins of Pietermaai after the 1877 hurricane

On 23 September 1877, Curaçao was struck by Hurricane Pundi, which caused massive destruction. Pietermaai was the hardest hit part of the island. Large parts of the neighbourhood were destroyed or swept away by the waves.

Pietermaai used to have a combination of wealthy, and working class wards. In the 1970s, Pietermaai started to experience urban decay, and became known for its drug dealing. The neighbourhood started an extensive program of urban renewal. In the 21st century, it became a trendy neighbourhood known for its night life and Jazz bars. In 1997, the historic centre of Willemstad including Pietermaai was designated a Unesco World Heritage Site.

== Bibliography ==
- Benjamins, Herman Daniël; Snelleman, Johannes (1917). Encyclopaedie van Nederlandsch West-Indië (in Dutch). Leiden: Martinus Nijhoff Publishers – via Digital Library for Dutch Literature.
