= Luis Brión =

Venezuelan military officer

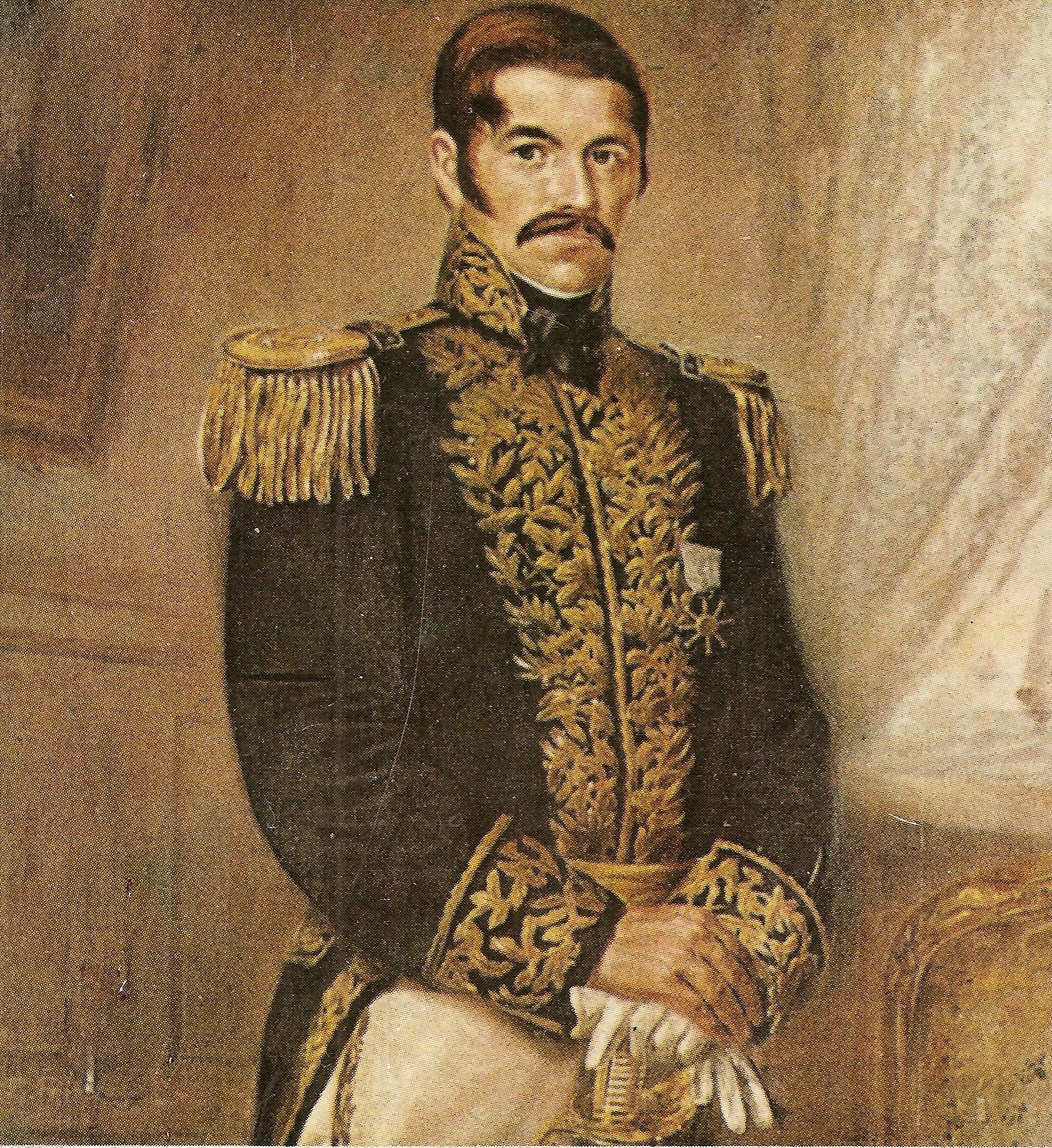
- Born: Felipe Luis Brión Detrox; July 6, 1782; Plantage Rozentak, Curaçao
- Died: September 27, 1821 (aged 39); Scharloo, Curaçao
- Burial place: National Pantheon of Venezuela
- Military career
- Rank: Admiral
- Conflicts: Venezuelan War of Independence

Felipe Luis Brión Detrox (July 6, 1782, Curaçao – September 27, 1821, Curaçao) was a military officer who fought in the Venezuelan War of Independence. He rose to the rank of admiral in the navies of Venezuela and the old Republic of Colombia.

== Early career ==
He was baptized as Phillipus Ludovicus Brion, son of the merchant Pierre Louis Brion and Marie Detrox, both from what is now Belgium. They arrived in Curaçao in 1777. In 1794 they sent their son to the Netherlands to complete his education. While he was there, he enlisted in the forces of the Batavian Republic to fight the British invasion of the northern Netherlands. He participated in the battles of Bergen (September 19, 1799) and Castricum (October 16, 1799). He was taken prisoner by the British but freed after a short time in the prisoner exchange under the Convention of Alkmaar.

On his return to Curaçao he took an active part in the revolutionary movement on the island, in September 1800. Shortly after his return the island was occupied by the British. He escaped from the British authorities, fleeing to the United States. There he studied naval science and business.

He returned to his native island in 1803 (since recovered by the Batavian Republic), dedicating himself to business. From 1803 to 1806 he led various actions to prevent the British reoccupation of the island. Nevertheless, the British occupied the island again in 1807, and Brión went into exile on the Danish island of Saint Thomas. From here he continued to run his business and maritime interests.

== In the war for Venezuelan independence ==
In 1813 Brion took up the cause of Venezuelan independence and a year later Simón Bolívar made him captain of a frigate. In 1815 he went to England, where he acquired the 24-gun corvet Dardo, with which he intended to aid the rebels of Cartagena de Indias. To bring aid to the revolutionists, he had sailed from London for Cartagena at his own expense, with 14,000 stand of arms and a great quantity of military stores. Arriving too late to be useful in that quarter, he re-embarked for Les Cayes, Haiti, whither many emigrant patriots had repaired after the surrender of Cartagena. Bolívar, meanwhile, had also departed from Kingston to Port-au-Prince, where, on his promise of emancipating the slaves, Alexandre Pétion, the president of Haiti, offered him large supplies for a new expedition against the Spaniards in Venezuela. At Les Cayes he met Brion and the other emigrants, and in a general meeting proposed himself as the chief of the new expedition, on the condition of uniting the civil and military power in his person until the assembling of a general congress. The majority accepting his terms, the expedition sailed April 16, 1816 to the coast of Venezuela, with him as its commander and Brion as its captain. On May 2, 1816 he won his first victory over Spanish warships, in the Battle of Los Frailes.

On the day of the victory, Brion was named admiral by Bolívar. At Margarita Island the former succeeded in winning over Juan Bautista Arismendi, the commander of the island, in which he had reduced the Spaniards to the single spot of Pampatar. On Bolívar's formal promise to convoke a national congress at Venezuela, as soon as he should be master of the country, Arismendi summoned a junta in the cathedral of La Villa del Norte, and publicly proclaimed him the commander-in-chief of the republics of Venezuela and New Granada.

On May 31, 1816, Bolívar and Brion landed at Carupano, but did not dare prevent generals Santiago Marino and Manuel Piar from separating from him, and carrying on a war against Cumana under their own auspices. Weakened by this separation, he set sail, on Brion's advice, for Ocumare de la Costa, where he arrived July 3, 1816, with 13 vessels, of which 7 only were armed. His army mustered but 650 men, swelled, by the enrolment of negroes whose emancipation he had proclaimed, to about 800.

On his advance in the direction of Valencia he met, not far from Ocumare, the Spanish general Morales at the head of about 200 soldiers and 100 militia men. The skirmishers of Morales having dispersed his advanced guard, he lost, as an eyewitness records,

...all presence of mind, spoke not a word, turned his horse quickly round, and fled in full speed toward Ocumare, passed the village at full gallop, arrived at the neighboring bay, jumped from his horse, got into a boat, and embarked on the Diana, ordering the whole squadron to follow him to the little island of Bonaire, and leaving all his companions without any means of assistance.

On Brion's rebukes and admonitions, Bolívar again joined the other commanders on the coast of Cumana, but being harshly received, and threatened by Piar with trial before a court-martial as a deserter and a coward, he quickly retraced his steps to Les Cayes. After months of exertion, Brion at length succeeded in persuading a majority of the Venezuelan military chiefs, who felt the want of at least a nominal centre, to recall Bolívar as their general-in-chief, upon the express condition that he should assemble a congress, and not meddle with the civil administration. December 31, 1816, he arrived at Barcelona with the arms, munitions of war, and provisions supplied by President Pétion.

Joined on January 2, 1817, by Arismendi, Brion proclaimed on the 4th martial law and the union of all powers in his single person; but 5 days later, when Arismendi had fallen into an ambush laid by the Spaniards, the dictator fled to Barcelona. The troops rallied at the latter place, whither Brion sent him also guns and reinforcements, so that he soon mustered a new corps of 1,100 men. On April 5, the Spaniards took possession of the town of Barcelona, and the patriot troops retreated toward the charity-house, a building isolated from Barcelona, and entrenched on Bolívar's order, but unfit to shelter a garrison of 1,000 men from a serious attack. He left the post in the night of April 5, informing Colonel Freites, to whom he transferred his command, that he was going in search of more troops, and would soon return. Trusting this promise, Freites declined the offer of a capitulation, and, after the assault, was slaughtered with the whole garrison by the Spaniards.

General Manuel Piar, a mulatto native of Curaçao, conceived and executed the conquest of Guayana Province with Admiral Brion supporting that enterprise with his gun-boats. In January 1817 Brión established the Admiralty and the Marine Corps. On August 3, 1817 he sailed up the Orinoco River with a squadron, fighting the Battle of Cabrián. In this battle he captured 14 of the 28 Spanish ships and took 1,500 prisoners. He liberated Guayana on November 5, 1817, and was named president of the Council of Government. On July 20, the whole of the provinces being evacuated by the Spaniards, Piar, Brion, Zea, Marino, Arismendi, and others, assembled a provincial congress at Angostura, and put at the head of the executive a triumvirate, of which Brion, hating Piar and deeply interested in Bolívar, in whose success he had invested his large private fortune, contrived that the latter should be appointed a member, notwithstanding his absence.

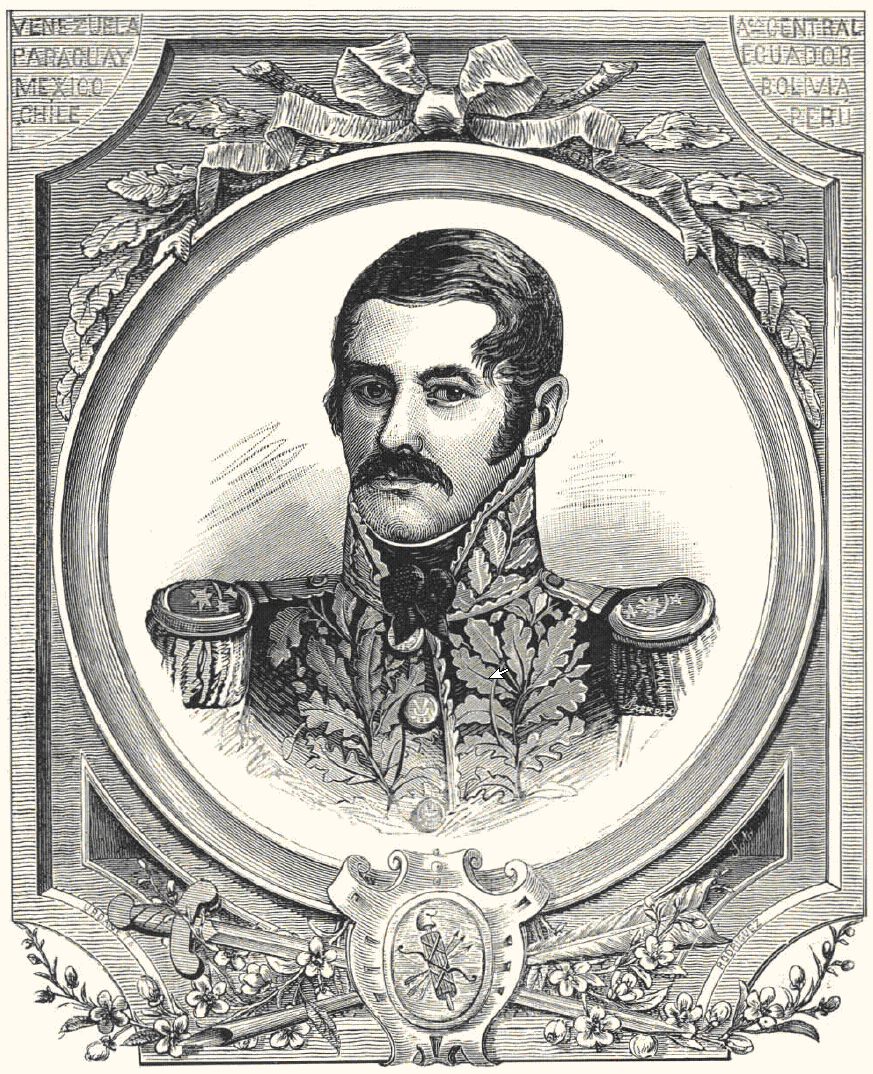
Portrait of Luis Brión, in Papel Periódico Ilustrado (1885).

Upon these tidings Bolívar left his retreat for Angostura, where, emboldened by Brion, he dissolved the congress and the triumvirate, to replace them by a "supreme council of the nation", with himself as the chief, Brion and Francisco Antonio Zea as the directors, the former of the military, the latter of the political section. However, Piar, the conqueror of Guiana, who once before had threatened to try him before a court-martial as a deserter, was not sparing of his sarcasms against the "Napoleon of the retreat", and Bolívar consequently accepted a plan for getting rid of him. On the false accusation of having conspired against the whites, plotted against Bolívar's life, and aspired to the supreme power, Piar was arraigned before a war council under the presidency of Brion, convicted, condemned to death, and shot, October 16, 1817. His death struck Marino with terror. Fully aware of loss when deprived of Piar, he, in an abject letter, publicly calumniated his murdered friend, deprecated his own attempts at rivalry with the liberator, and threw himself upon Bolívar's magnanimity.

In 1819 Brión was again at Margarita, where he organized an expedition of 22 ships to attack the coast of New Granada, together with the land forces of colonel Mariano Montilla. They captured ports and the mouths of the Magdalena River, as well as the cities of Barranquilla and Santa Marta. However, differences with Montilla over how to conduct the operation led Brión to withdraw the fleet to Maracaibo in May 1821.

== Death ==
Brión suffered from tuberculosis, and because of the progression of the disease, he decided to return to his native island. He died there in 1821, the day after his arrival. He was buried in the family estate with honors appropriate to his rank. Later, his remains were reinterred in the National Pantheon of Venezuela on April 10, 1882.

== Homages ==
The Brión Square of Caracas and the Brión Square of Willemstad. Curaçao's only racetrack is named Hipódromo Almirante Pedro Luis Brión in homage. At Utrecht, Netherlands, the street immediately near the Simon Bolivarstraat bear the name of Pedro Luis Brión.
