= Luigison V. Doran =

Curaçao footballer

Luigison V. Doran (born 29 September 1987 in Willemstad, Curaçao) is a footballer with UNDEBA (Union Deportivo Banda Abou) in Curaçao.

== UNDEBA ==
Doran is a starting player on the Banda Abou team. He usually plays on the wings, but occasionally has been used as a defender or a targetman.

In the 2005/2006 season, he scored the only goal in the final game against Centro Social Deportivo Barber, winning the Curaçao League for his team.

== National team ==
Doran has played for the U-23 Netherlands Antilles national football team.
