= Scharloo =

Scharloo Skálo
- Neighbourhood
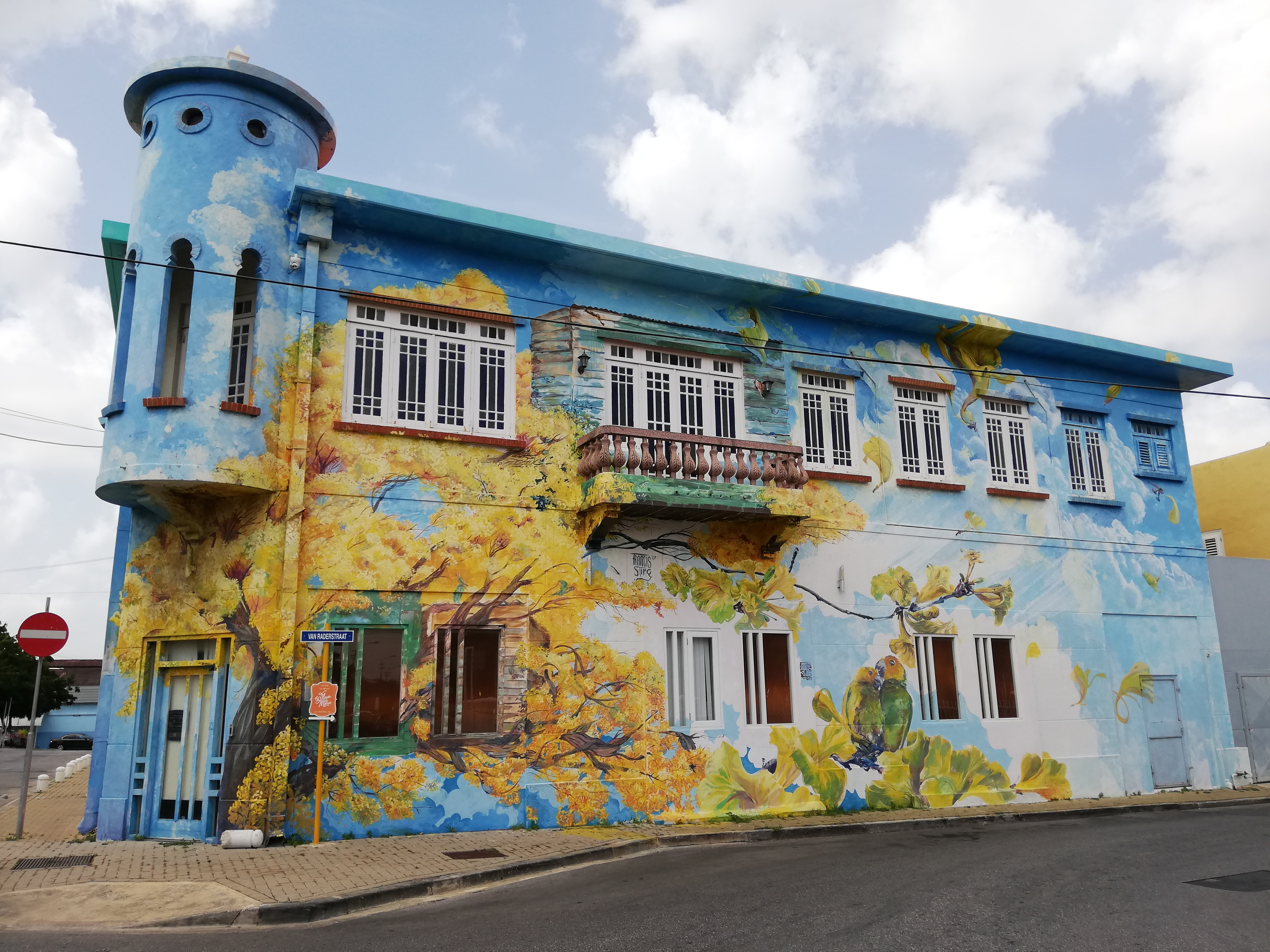
- House in Scharloo with a wall painting by Francis Sling

- Location in Curaçao
- Coordinates: 12°06′22″N 68°55′35″W
- State: Kingdom of the Netherlands
- Country: Curaçao
- City: Willemstad

Population (2011)
  - Total: 523

Scharloo (Papiamento: Skálo) is a neighbourhood and former suburb of Willemstad, Curaçao, a Lesser Antilles island in the Dutch Caribbean. Scharloo started as a plantation, but became a wealthy neighbourhood of Willemstad. Scharloo has been designated a UNESCO World Heritage Site.

== History ==
Scharloo started in 1634 as a plantation of the Dutch West Indies Company. The ground turned out to be infertile, and the plantation was soon abandoned. In 1694, the first wharf was built on Scharloo. In 1753, some houses had been built in Scharloo, however the government considered the area important for defence and did not allow new construction.

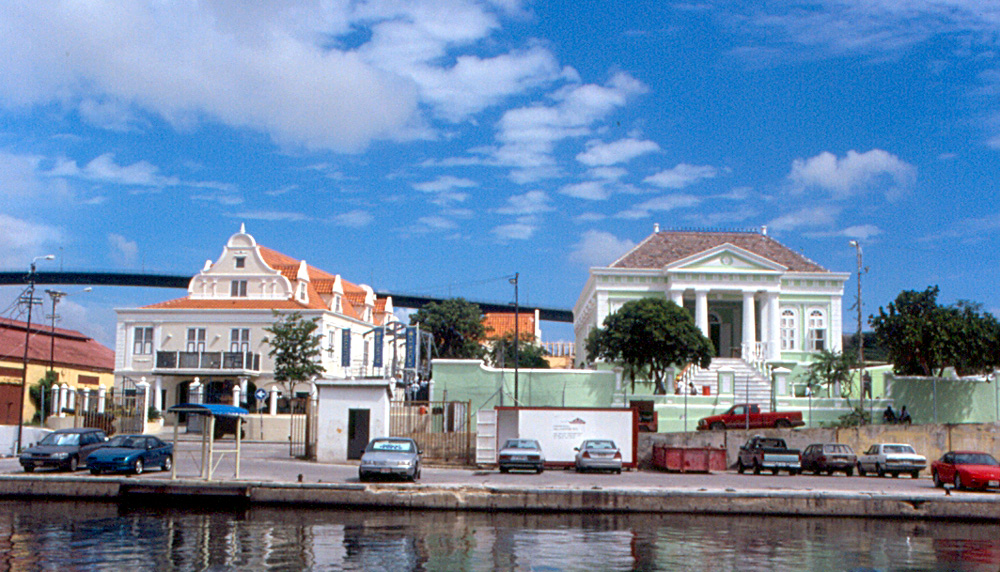
Villas in Scharloo

From 1850 onwards, Scharloo started to develop. In 1861, the city walls were demolished, and a bridge was built in 1881, connecting Scharloo with Pietermaai.

From 1870 onwards, wealthy Jewish merchants started to build villas in Scharloo. The hurricane of 1877, which destroyed a large part of the neighbourhood of Pietermaai, accelerated Scharloo's growth and it quickly became the wealthiest part of the city.

During the 1960s, Scharloo started to decline with many of its inhabitants moving to the suburbs. In 1999, Scharloo was designated a Unesco World Heritage Site and part of the historic centre of Willemstad. The neighbourhood was renovated in the early 21st century, and many of the villas are now in use as offices or governmental agencies. Scharloo is home to the Maritiem Museum Curaçao which is located in a building from 1729, and offers an overview of the maritime history of Curaçao which spans 500 years.

== Scharlooweg ==
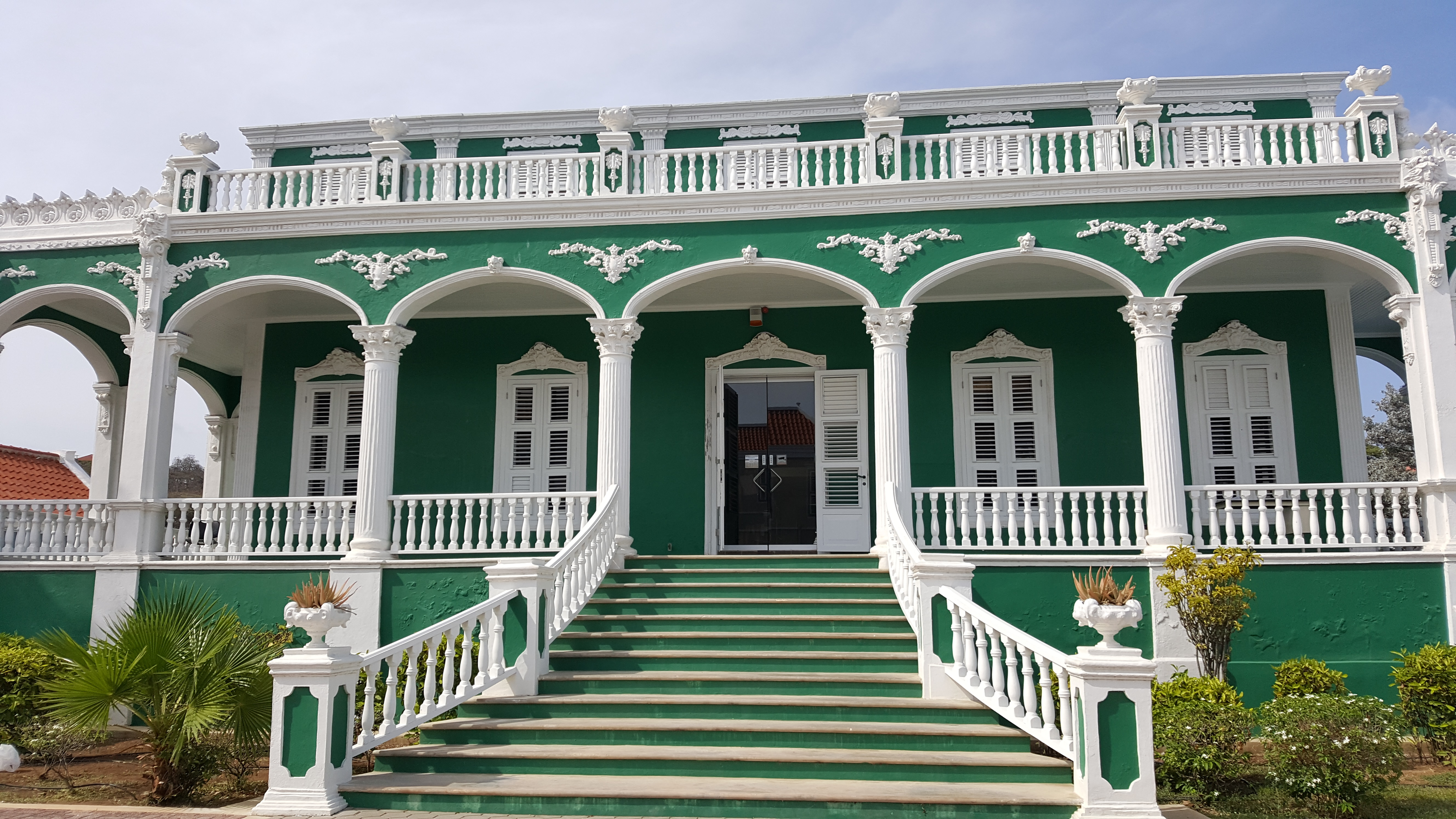
Bolo di Batrei (Wedding Cake)

Scharlooweg is the main street of the neighbourhood, and has the largest and most luxurious villas of Scharloo. The buildings have been constructed in Spanish style around a patio with often a fountain in the middle.

Bolo di Batrei (Wedding Cake) on Scharlooweg 77 is the most famous building of the street. Elias Salomon Levy Maduro was the son of the founder of S.E.L. Maduro. When Deborah Rebecca, his 18-year-old daughter, got married, the original building was torn down and replaced by a new building with elaborate painted ceilings. On 6 June 1917, the day of the wedding, Bolo di Batrei was given to the newly weds as a present. Nowadays, the building is home to the National Archive of Curaçao.

== Bibliography ==
- Benjamins, Herman Daniël; Snelleman, Johannes (1917). Encyclopaedie van Nederlandsch West-Indië (in Dutch). Leiden: Martinus Nijhoff Publishers – via Digital Library for Dutch Literature.
- Buurtprofiel Scharloo (2011). "Buurtprofiel Scharloo" (PDF). Government of Curaçao (in Dutch).
