= Maduro & Curiel's Bank =

Dutch Caribbean bank

Maduro & Curiel's Bank N.V.
- Type: Private
- Industry: Financial services
- Founded: 1916
- Area served: Curaçao, Aruba, Bonaire, Sint Maarten, Sint Eustatius
- Key people: I.E. McGlynn (Chairman); Quinten Fraai (President & CEO)
- Revenue: ▲US$ 358.2 million (2025)
- Net income: ▲US$ 131.8 million (2025)
- Total assets: ▲US$ 6.5 billion (2025)
- Number of employees: 1,300 (2025)
- Website: MCB-Bank.com

Maduro & Curiel's Bank N.V. (MCB) is a private Dutch Caribbean bank and financial services provider headquartered in Willemstad, Curaçao, that specializes in insurance brokerage, consumer banking, trust, private banking, and corporate management services.

== History ==
Beginning in 1893, a shortage of coins and banknotes in Curaçao led S.E.L. Maduro & Sons to issue money coupons, which remained in circulation until the introduction of the 1901 Coinage Act. Known as 'Maduro Money', the coupons were accepted as payment on the ABC islands for many years. By the early 20th century, however, growing industrialization following the discovery of oil in nearby Venezuela and the opening of the Panama Canal created demand for modern banking services.

On December 16, 1916, following a failed bid to take over the Central Bank of Curaçao, local financier Joseph "Shon Jojo" Alvarez-Correa, with financial backing from S.E.L. Maduro & Sons, established Maduro's Bank, the island's first commercial bank. In 1932, Curiel's Bank, which had been founded by members of the Curiel family and had grown out of the banking department of Morris E. Curiel & Sons, merged with Maduro's Bank to form MCB.

Since 1970, MCB has been affiliated with Scotiabank.

== Maduro & Curiel's Group ==
- Maduro & Curiel's Bank N.V.
- Caribbean Mercantile Bank N.V. and subsidiary
- Maduro & Curiel’s Bank (Bonaire) N.V. and subsidiary
- Maduro & Curiel’s Insurance Services N.V.
- MCB Risk Insurance N.V.
- MCB Group Insurance N.V.
- MCB Securities Holding B.V.
- MCB Securities Administration N.V.
- Progress N.V.
- MCB Holding International VBA and subsidiaries
