= Willemstad =

Capital and the largest city of Curaçao

- Capital city
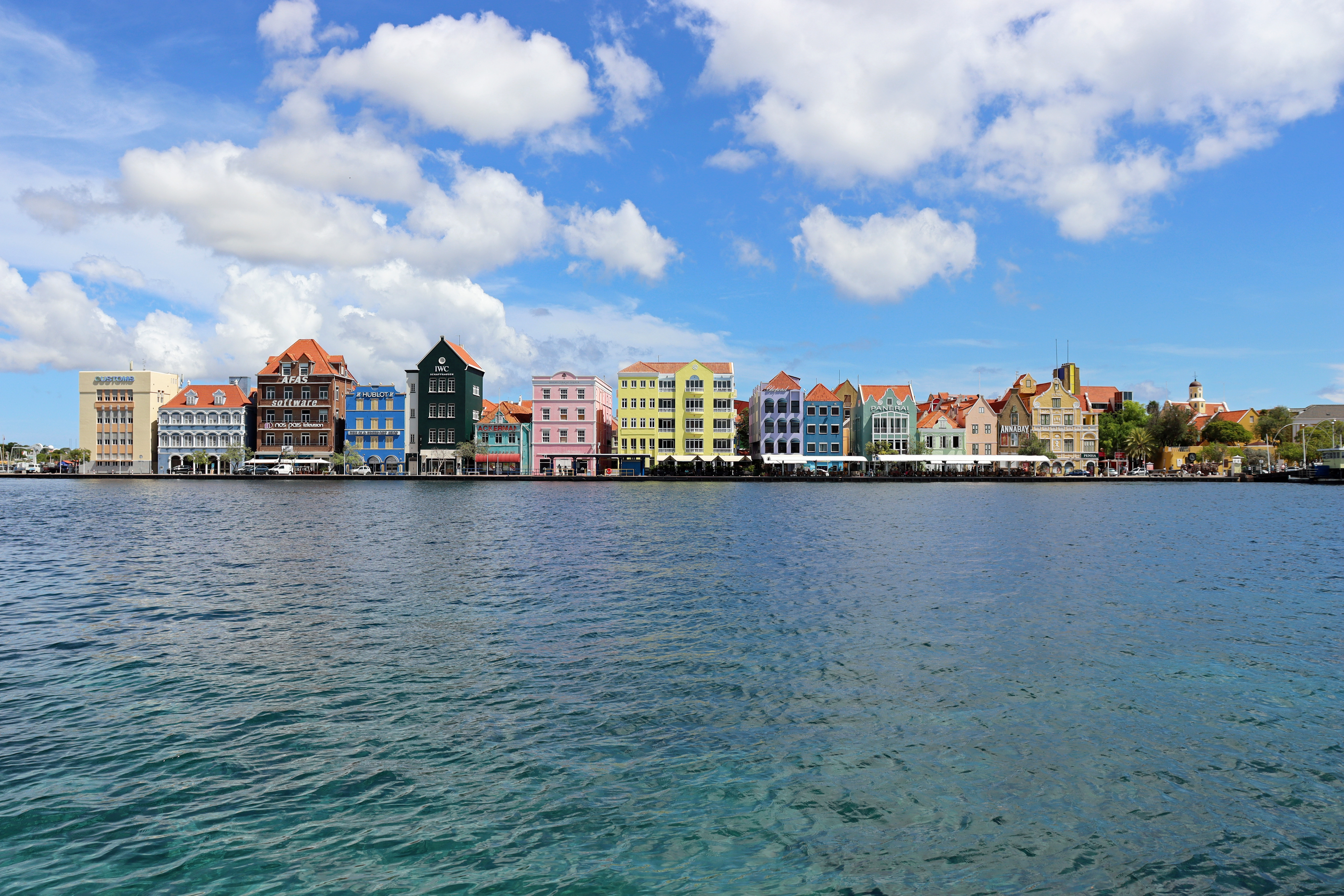
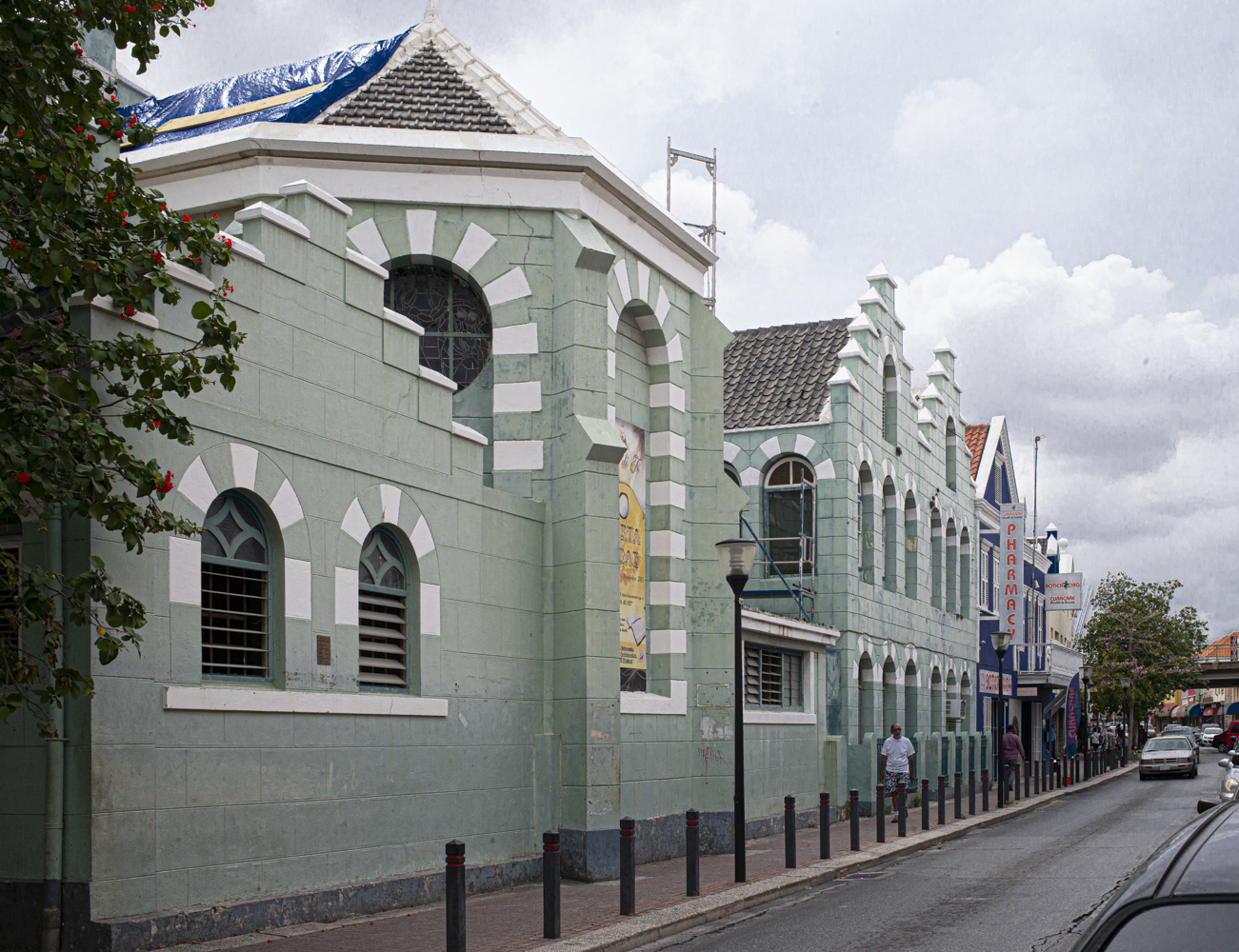
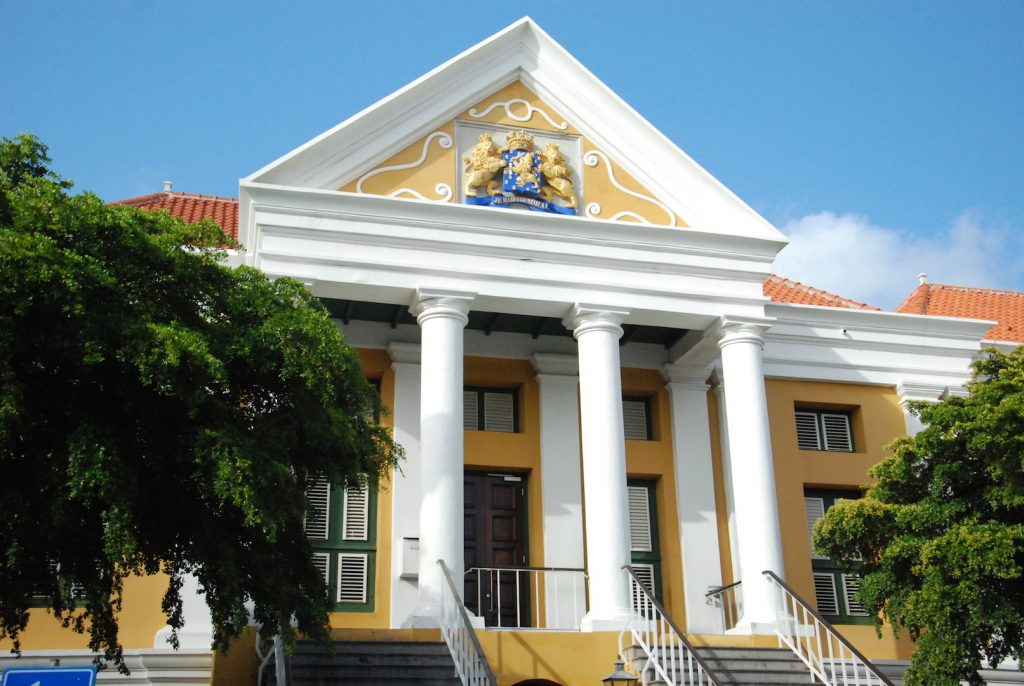
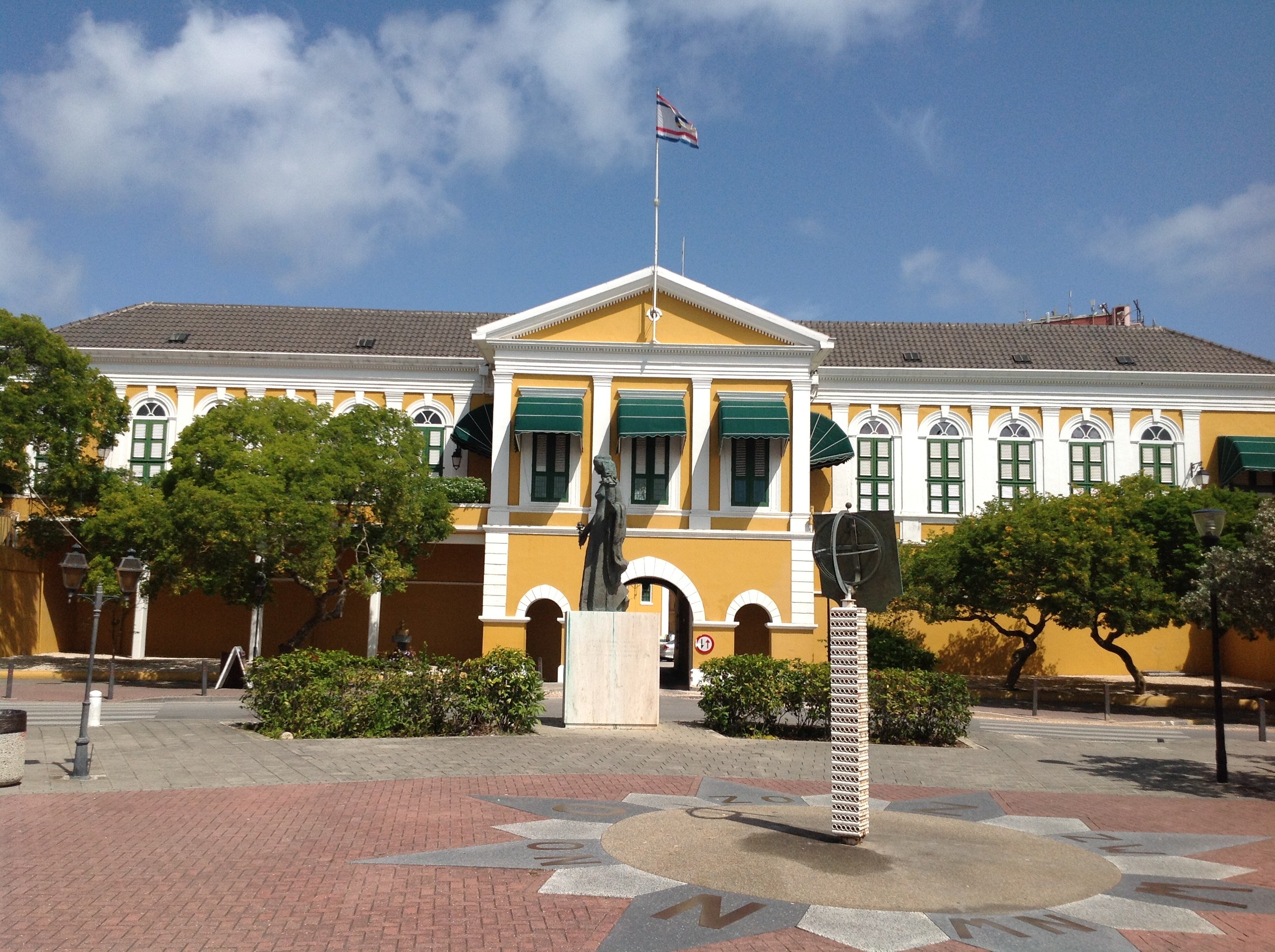
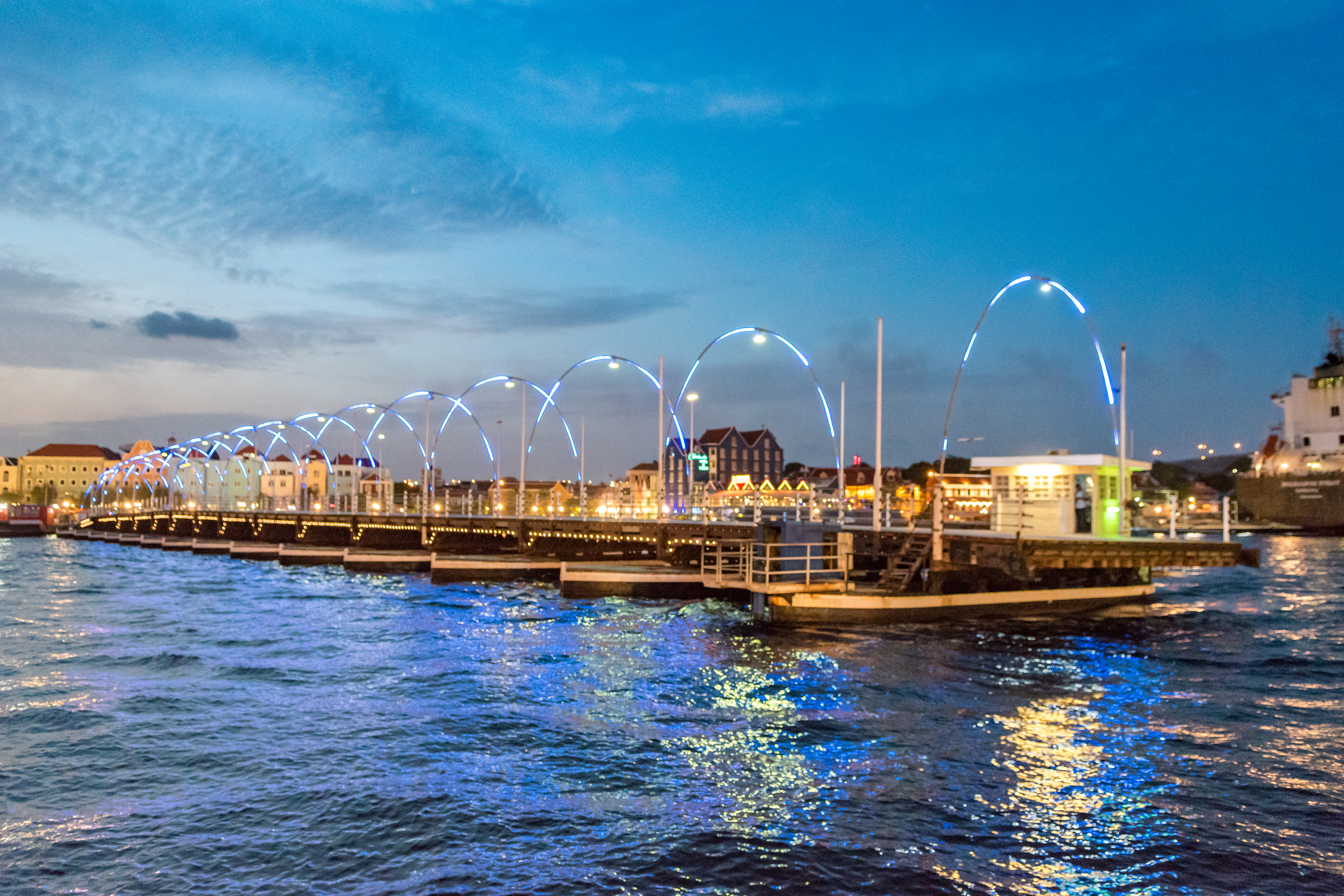
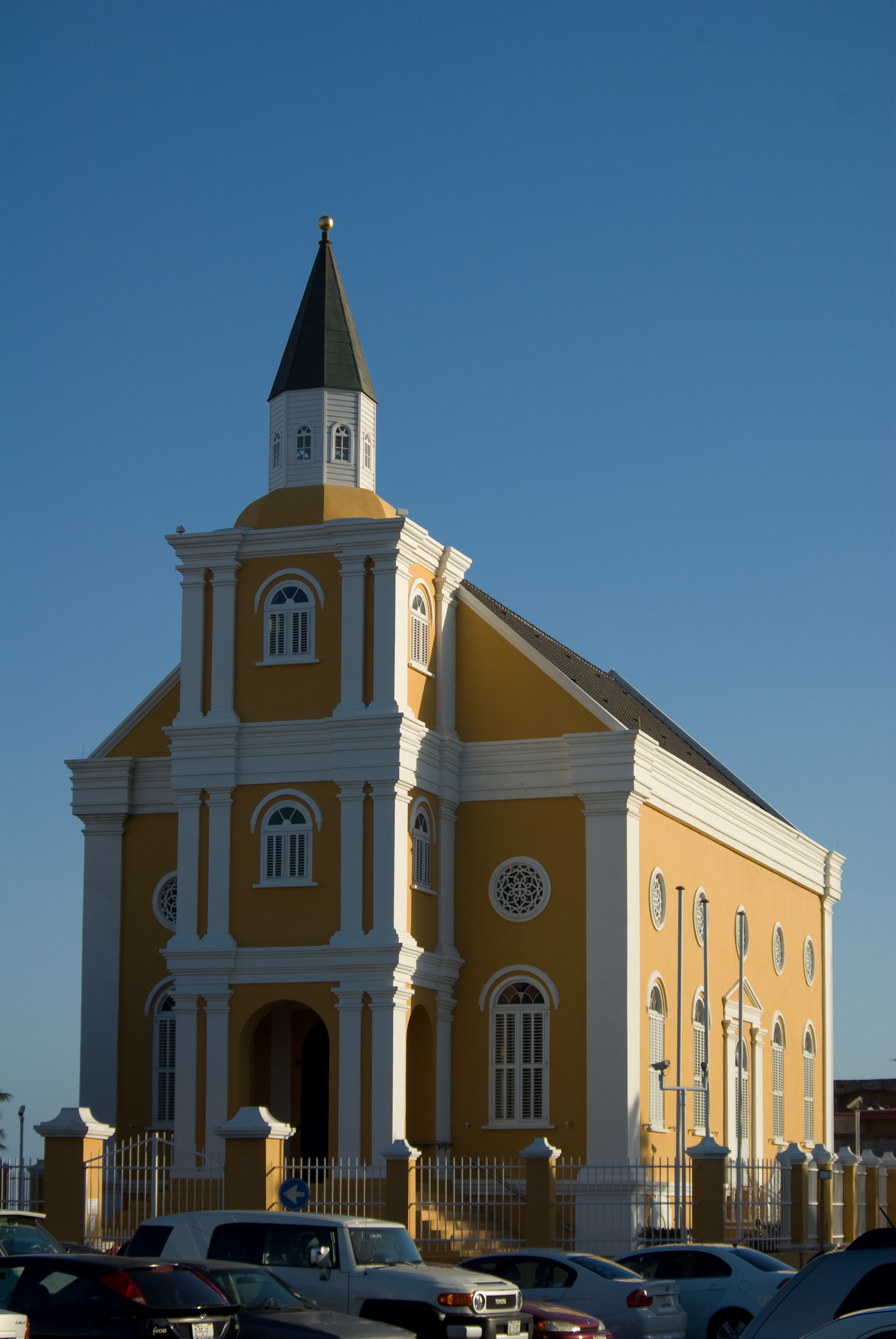
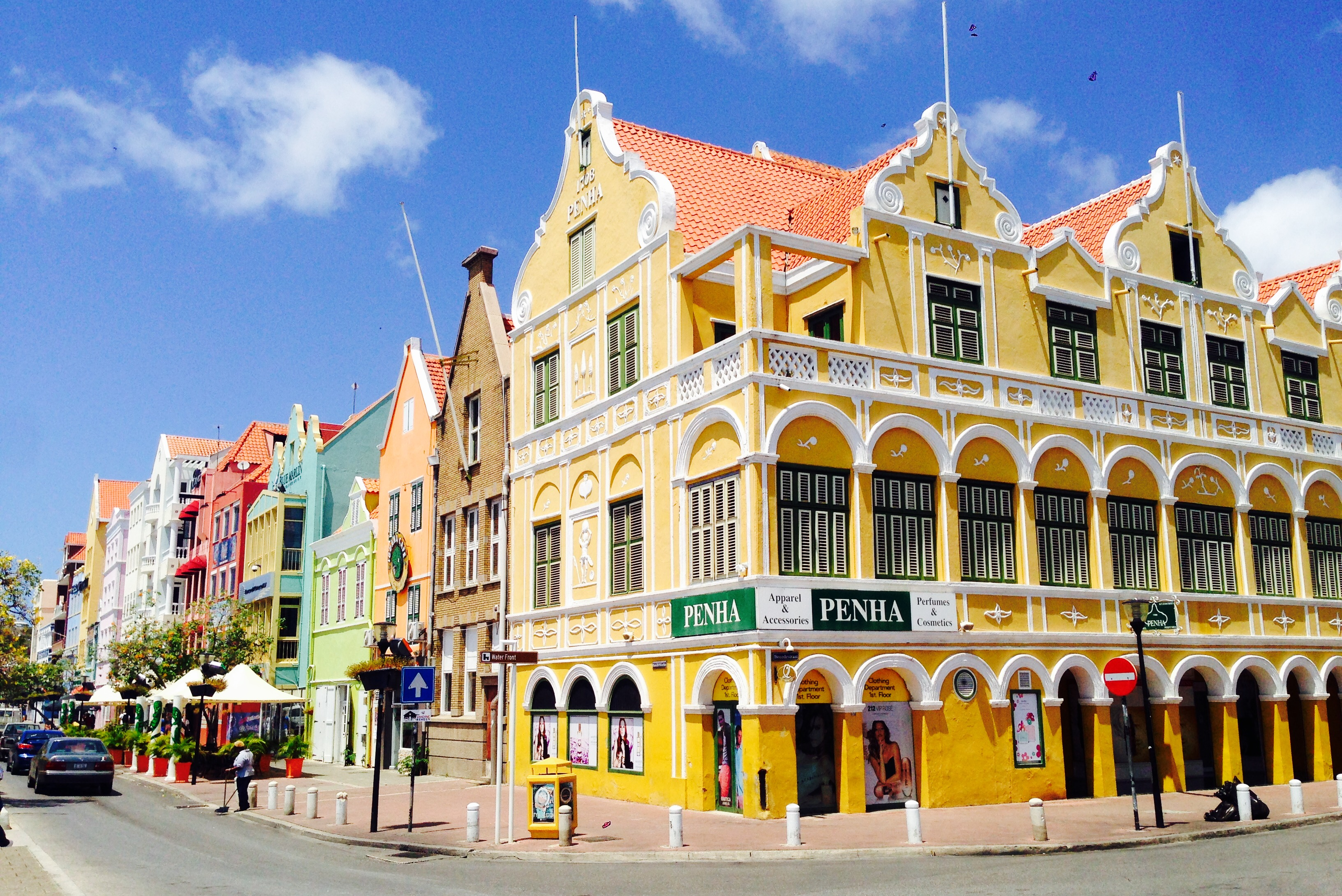
- View of Central Willemstad Basilica of St Anne Willemstad Town Hall Fort Amsterdam Queen Emma Bridge Temple Emanu-El Penha Building

- Location within Curaçao Location within the Caribbean Location within North America
- Coordinates: 12°7′N 68°56′W
- State: Kingdom of the Netherlands
- Country: Curaçao
- Established: 1634
- Quarters: Punda, Otrobanda, Scharloo, Pietermaai Smal

Area
  - Total: 144 km^{2} (56 sq mi)

Population (2011)
  - Total: 136,660
  - Density: 949/km^{2} (2,460/sq mi)
- Time zone: UTC-04:00 (AST)
  - Summer (DST): (Not Observed)

UNESCO World Heritage Site
- Official name: Historic Area of Willemstad, Inner City and Harbour, Curaçao
- Criteria: Cultural: ii, iv, v
- Reference: 819
- Inscription: 1997 (21st Session)
- Area: 86 ha (210 acres)
- Buffer zone: 87 ha (210 acres)

Willemstad (/ˈwɪləmstɑːt, ˈvɪl-/ WIL-əm-staht, VIL-; Dutch: [ˈʋɪləmstɑt]; Papiamento: [wiləmˈstad]) is the capital and largest city of Curaçao, an island in the southern Caribbean Sea that is a constituent country of the Kingdom of the Netherlands. It was the capital of the Netherlands Antilles prior to that entity's dissolution in 2010. The city accounts for around 90% of Curaçao's population, with 136,660 inhabitants as of 2011. The historic centre of the city consists of four quarters: the Punda and Otrobanda, which are separated by the Sint Anna Bay, an inlet that leads into the large natural harbour called the Schottegat, as well as the Scharloo and Pietermaai Smal quarters, which are across from each other on the smaller Waaigat harbour. Willemstad is home to the Curaçao synagogue, the oldest surviving synagogue in the Americas. The city centre, with its unique architecture and harbour entry, has been designated a UNESCO World Heritage Site.

== History ==
Punda was established in 1634, when the Dutch West India Company captured the island from Spain. The original name of Punda was de punt ('the point') in Dutch. The city was constructed as a walled city. It soon developed into one of the major centres of the Atlantic slave trade which triggered a rapid population growth. In 1674, the Curaçao synagogue was built by Sephardic Portuguese Jews from Amsterdam and Recife, Brazil who had settled in the city as traders. In the late 17th century, there were over 200 houses within the city walls.

In 1675, it was decided to construct the town of Pietermaai outside of the enclosed city. It was to be separated from the city by an area of about 500 m (550 yd) in which construction was not allowed so as not to obstruct the cannons in Fort Amsterdam.

The name "Willemstad" (William Town) is in honour of William II, Prince of Orange (1626–1650) and/or William III, Prince of Orange (1650–1702), is first recorded in 1680.

In 1707, the suburb of Otrobanda was founded. Otrobanda would become the cultural centre of Willemstad. Its name originated from the Papiamentu otro banda, which means "the opposite side". The suburb of Scharloo followed, however Willemstad continued to experience growth. By 1818, the population of Willemstad had grown to 9,536 people. On 13 May 1861, a decision was made to demolish the city walls, and build residential houses in the gap separating Willemstad from Pietermaai.

Around 1925, the booming oil and phosphate industry further stimulated growth, and resulted in the creation of new neighbourhoods. Between 1945 and 1955, Julianadorp and Emmastad were created by Royal Dutch Shell to house the new workers. In 1985, the oil refinery which employed 12,000 people was closed down by Shell. The Government of Curaçao decided to buy the refinery for ƒ 1.00 and take responsibility for all future pollution claims. In 1986, it was leased to the Venezuelan PDVSA, and reopened on a limited scale. In 2017, the PDVSA was hit by punitive sanctions of the United States Government, and attempts have been made to seize the refinery.

On 30 May 1969, the Curaçao uprising, a strike at a subcontractor of the oil refinery, turned into a riot. The riot resulted in two deaths, 300 arrests and a part of the historic centre being burnt down. The Netherlands Marine Corps was sent to Willemstad and the entire city centre was closed down.

In 1997, the centre of Willemstad and its former suburbs were designated a UNESCO World Heritage Site. In the 21st century, a largescale program of renovation started.

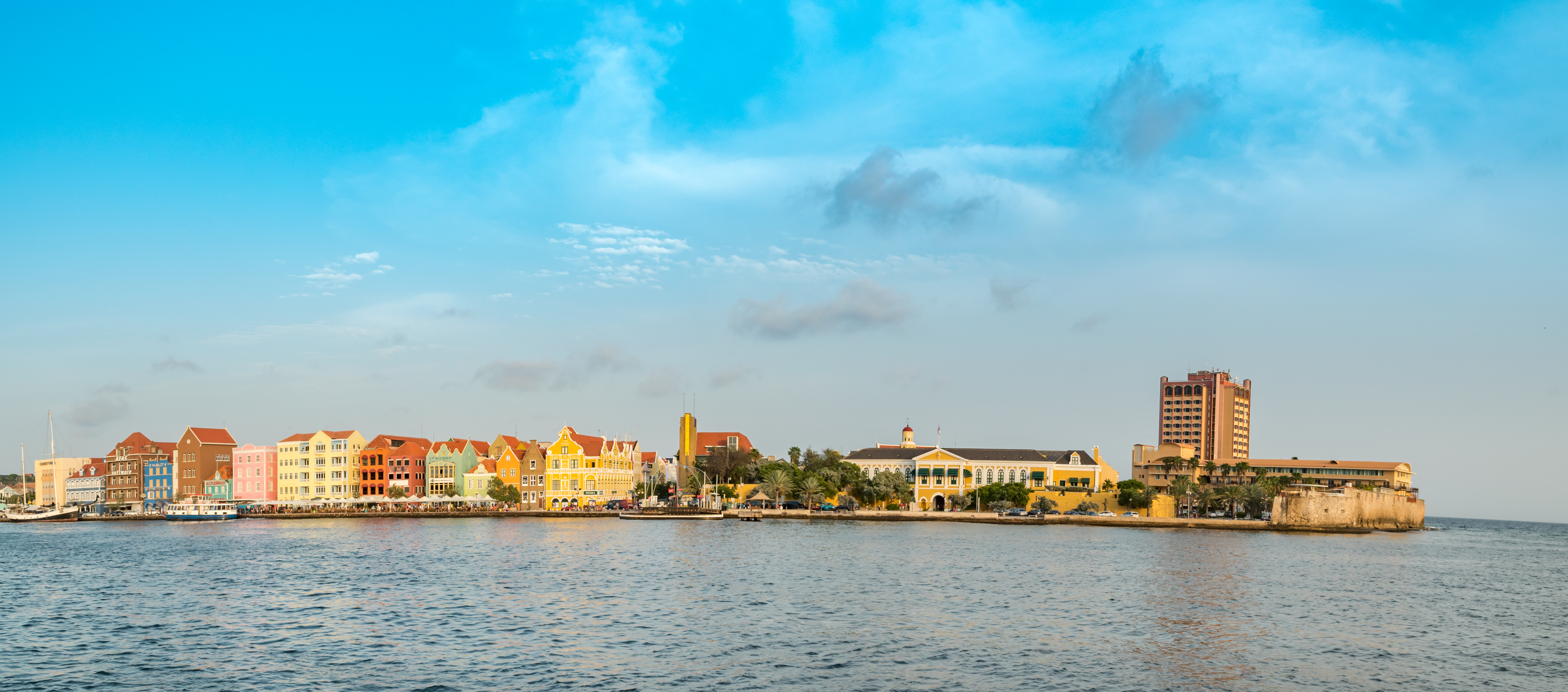
Willemstad in the late afternoon

== Economy ==
=== Aviation ===
Jetair Caribbean, the national airline of Curaçao, has its corporate head office in Maduro Plaza.

=== Tourism ===
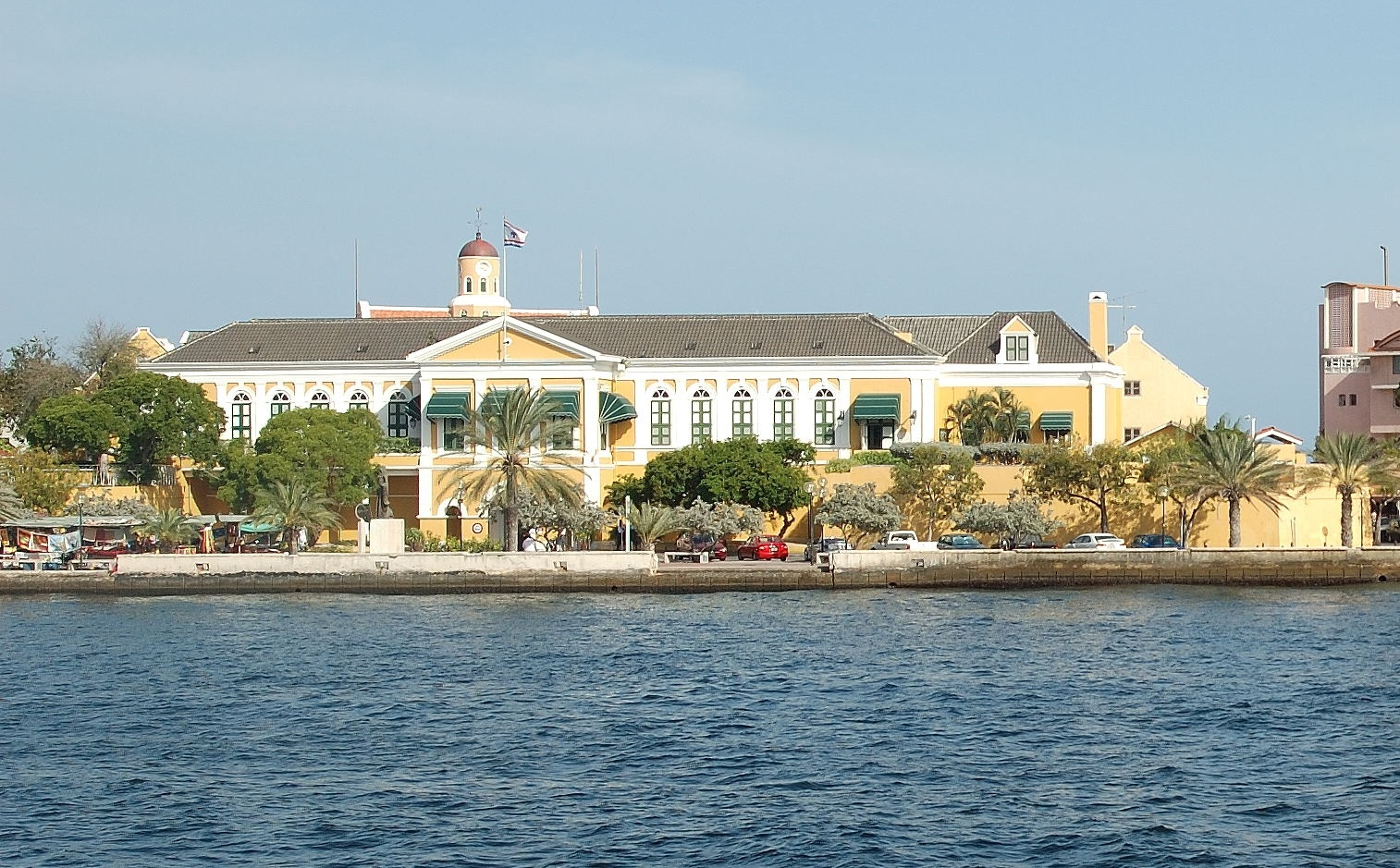
Fort Amsterdam as seen from sea

Tourism is a major industry and the city has several casinos. The city centre of Willemstad has an array of colonial architecture that is influenced by Dutch styles. Archaeological research has also been developed there. The city is also home to several beaches like Baya Beach.

=== Industry ===
Owing to its location near the Venezuelan oilfields, its political stability and its natural deep water harbour, Willemstad became the site of an important seaport and refinery. Willemstad's harbour is one of the largest oil handling ports in the Caribbean. The refinery, at one point the largest in the world, was originally built and owned by Royal Dutch Shell in 1915.

The four companies comprising the Royal Dutch Shell refining operation; the actual refinery, oil bunkering, the tugboat company (KTK) and the local distribution of refined products (CurOli/Gas) were each sold to the government of Curaçao in 1985 for the symbolic sum of one guilder per company, or a total of 4 guilders and is now leased to PDVSA, the state owned Venezuelan oil company. Schlumberger, the world's largest oil field services company is incorporated in Willemstad.

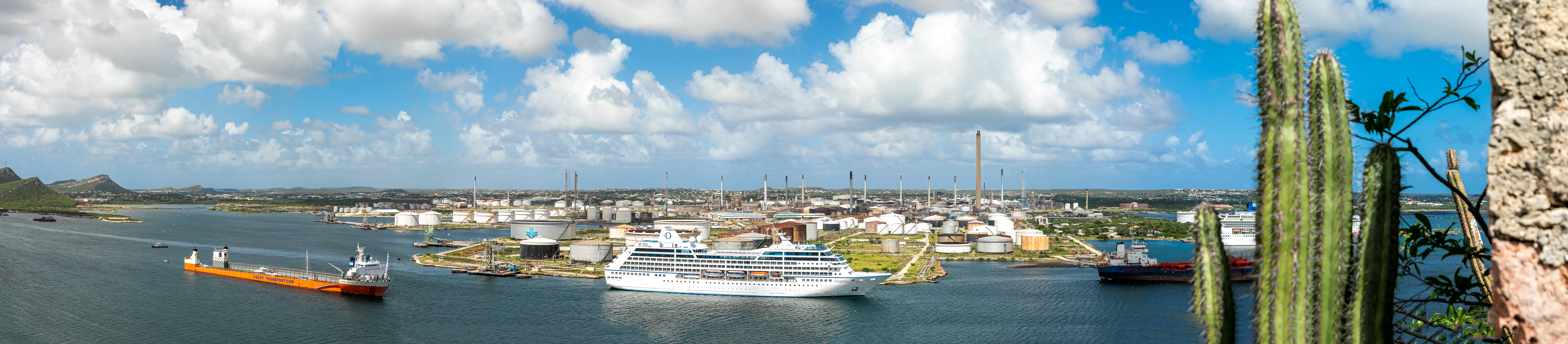
Isla Oil Refinery in Port of Willemstad photographed from Fort Nassau

=== Financial services ===
Numerous financial institutions are incorporated in Willemstad due to Curaçao's favourable tax policies.

== Education ==
The University of Curaçao is the national university of Curaçao and located in Willemstad. The Avalon University School of Medicine is located in Willemstad. The Caribbean Medical University is also located in Willemstad, close to the city centre.

== Sports ==
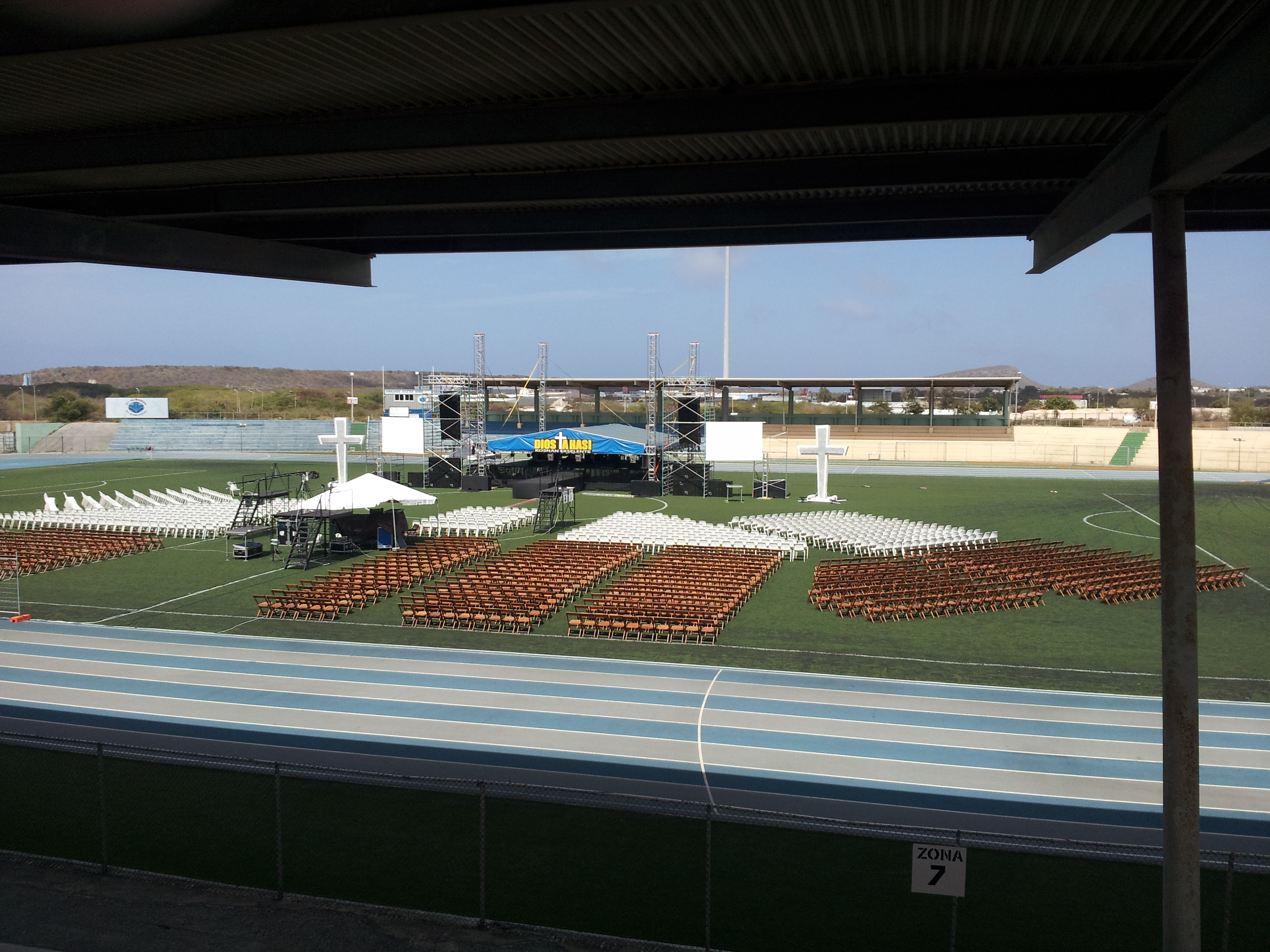
Ergilio Hato Stadium

Major League Baseball players Jair Jurrjens, Wladimir Balentien, Jurickson Profar, Andruw Jones, Ozzie Albies, Kenley Jansen, Jonathan Schoop, Ceddanne Rafaela and Andrelton Simmons are from Willemstad.

Noted tennis doubles player Jean-Julien Rojer was born in Willemstad.

Enith Brigitha, a bronze medalist swimmer who represented the Netherlands in the Summer Olympics was born in Willemsted. She was also the first black athlete to win a swimming medal at the Olympics.

In 1985, Willemstad hosted the Curaçao Grand Prix for Formula 3000. The race was won by Danish racing driver John Nielsen. Pabao Little League has appeared in sixteen Little League World Series, winning in 2004. They were crowned the International Champions in 2005, 2019, 2022, and 2023. In 2008, another Pabao Little League team won the Junior League World Series.

== Infrastructure ==
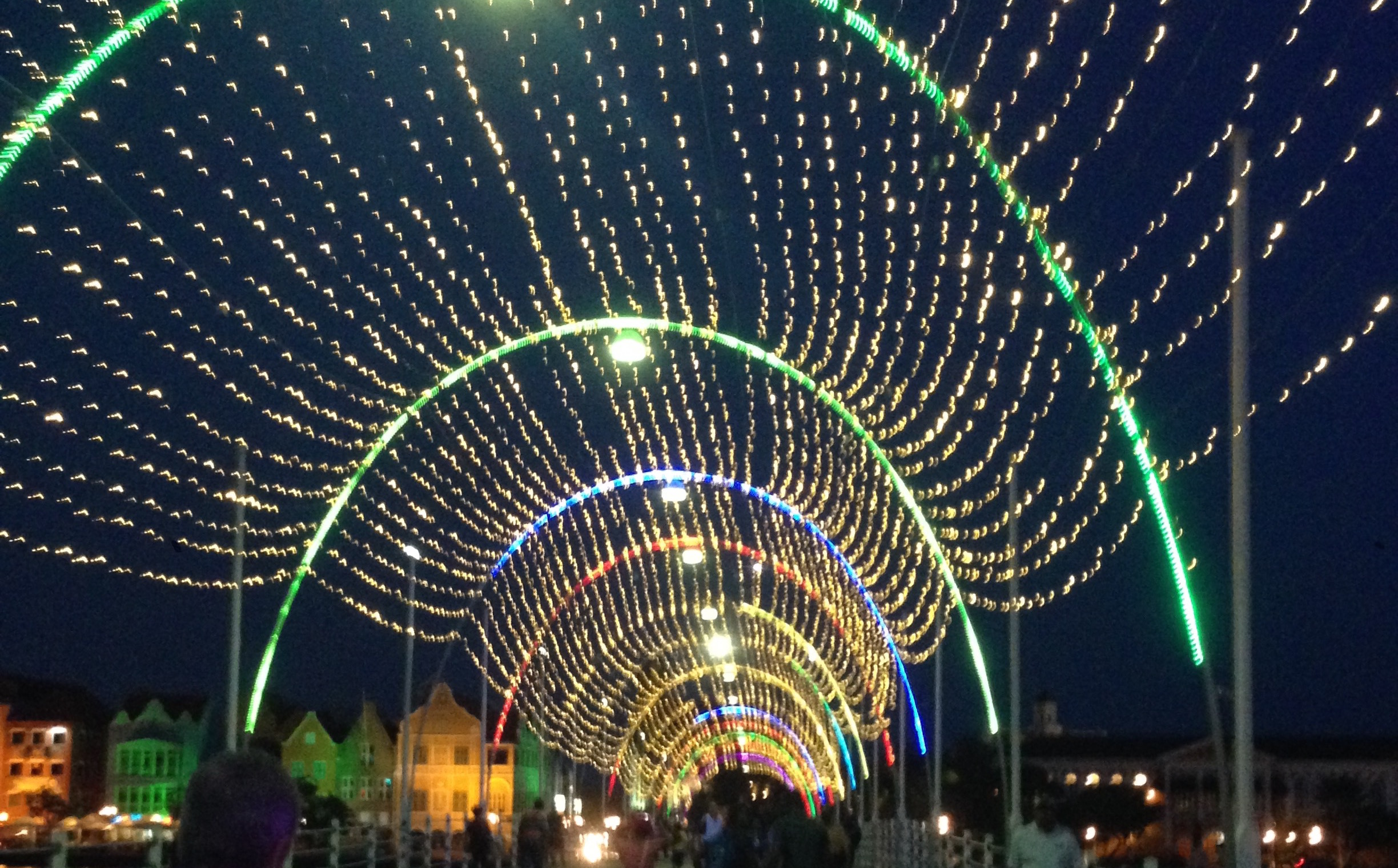
Queen Emma bridge

=== Airport ===
Willemstad is served by Curaçao International Airport, located 12 kilometres (7.5 mi) north of the city, which is annually used by about two million passengers.

=== Bridges ===
Punda and Otrobanda are connected by Queen Emma Bridge, a long pontoon bridge. Although it is still in use, these days most road traffic now uses the Queen Juliana Bridge built in 1967 (rebuilt 1974) which arches high over the bay further inland. Nearby is also the now non-functioning Queen Wilhelmina drawbridge.

== Geography ==
=== Climate ===
Willemstad has a hot semi-arid climate (Köppen: BSh), experiencing hot summers and winters.

Climate data for Willemstad
Month	Jan	Feb	Mar	Apr	May	Jun	Jul	Aug	Sep	Oct	Nov	Dec	Year
Mean daily maximum °C (°F)	26.4 (79.5)	26.2 (79.2)	26.3 (79.3)	26.7 (80.1)	27.3 (81.1)	27.5 (81.5)	27.5 (81.5)	28.1 (82.6)	28.6 (83.5)	28.4 (83.1)	27.9 (82.2)	27.2 (81.0)	27.3 (81.2)
Daily mean °C (°F)	25.9 (78.6)	25.8 (78.4)	25.9 (78.6)	26.4 (79.5)	27.0 (80.6)	27.1 (80.8)	27.1 (80.8)	27.7 (81.9)	28.1 (82.6)	27.8 (82.0)	27.2 (81.0)	26.6 (79.9)	26.9 (80.4)
Mean daily minimum °C (°F)	25.4 (77.7)	25.3 (77.5)	25.5 (77.9)	26.0 (78.8)	26.5 (79.7)	26.6 (79.9)	26.5 (79.7)	27.1 (80.8)	27.4 (81.3)	26.9 (80.4)	26.3 (79.3)	25.9 (78.6)	26.3 (79.3)
Average precipitation mm (inches)	63.3 (2.49)	36.0 (1.42)	32.4 (1.28)	39.7 (1.56)	45.4 (1.79)	52.5 (2.07)	50.2 (1.98)	52.2 (2.06)	66.2 (2.61)	127.4 (5.02)	170.6 (6.72)	91.5 (3.60)	827.4 (32.6)
Average relative humidity (%)	81.6	81.0	81.5	83.8	84.8	84.9	84.8	83.8	83.2	83.2	83.1	82.1	83.2
Mean monthly sunshine hours	277.3	272.2	299.1	280.4	293.7	294.5	304.4	299.7	279.4	261.6	247.6	269.7	3,379.6
Source: Weather.Directory

== Notable people ==
- Kemy Agustien, footballer
- Ozzie Albies, Major League Baseball player
- Tahith Chong, footballer
- Rebecca Cohen Henriquez, activist
- Guliano Diaz, former professional footballer
- Luigison V. Doran, footballer
- Jan Helenus Ferguson, Colonial governor of the Dutch Gold Coast
- Elson Hooi, footballer
- Jacky Jakoba, baseball player
- Andruw Jones, Hall of Fame baseball player
- George Maduro, World War II resistance member and recipient of the Military Order of William
- Manuel Piar, general-in-chief of the army during the Venezuelan War of Independence
- Ceddanne Rafaela, Major League Baseball player
- Jean-Julien Rojer, tennis player
- Gerrit Schotte, 1st Prime Minister of Curaçao
- Jonathan Schoop, baseball player
- Kenley Jansen, Major League Baseball pitcher
- Luis Brión, admiral during the Venezuelan war of independence
- Jurickson Profar, Major League Baseball player

== Gallery ==
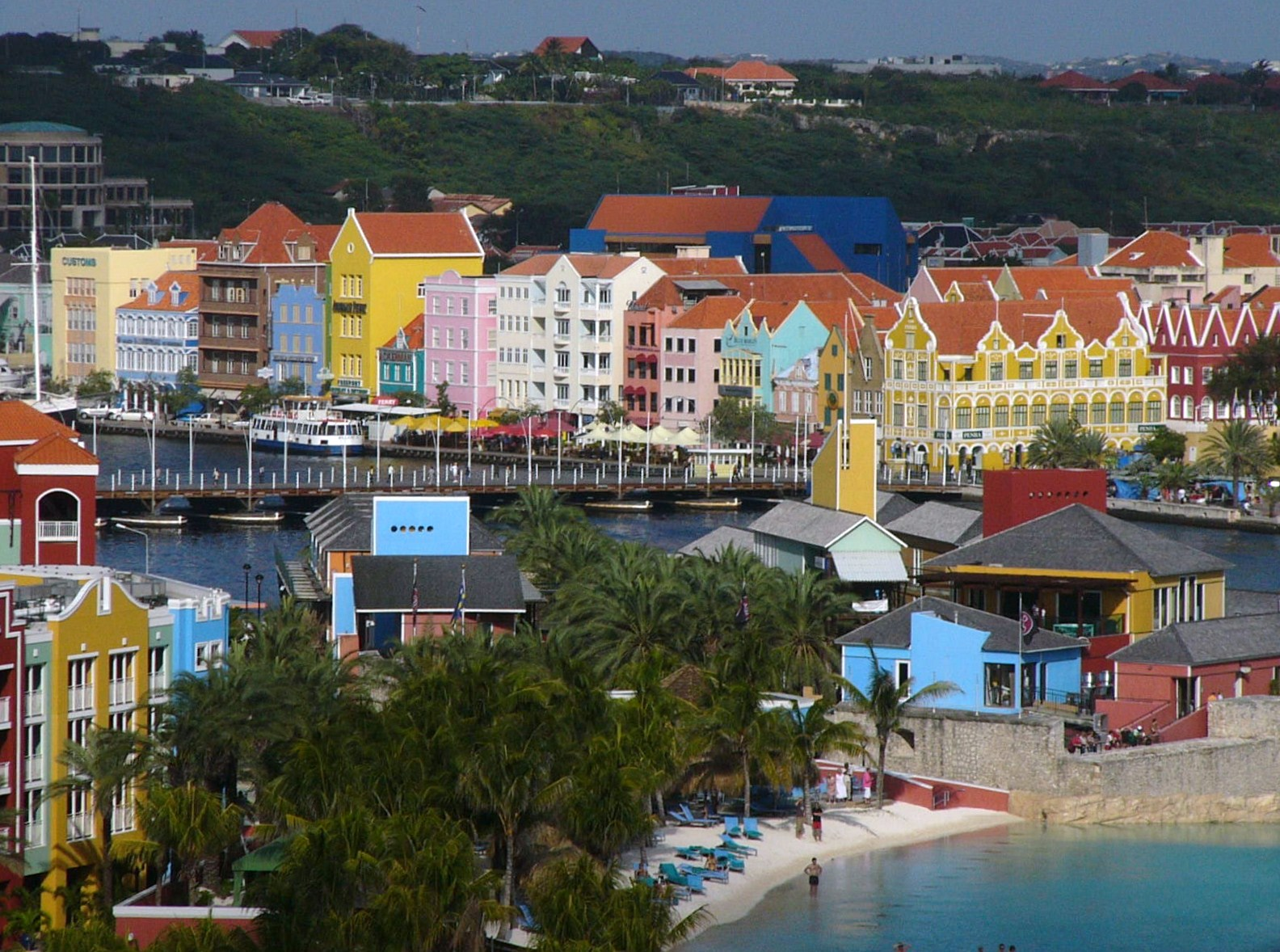
Colorful historic part of Willemstad

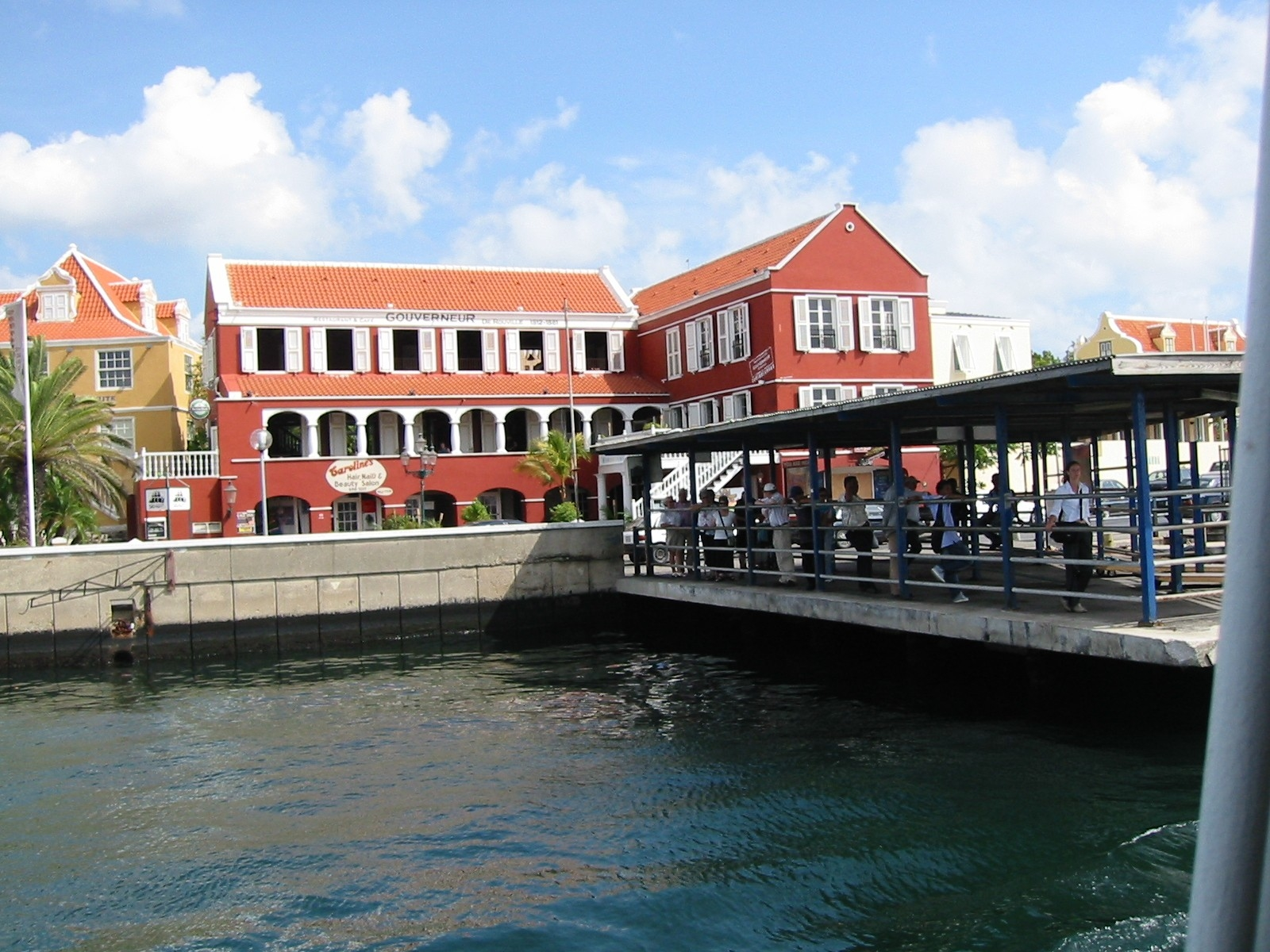
Buildings in historic area of Willemstad

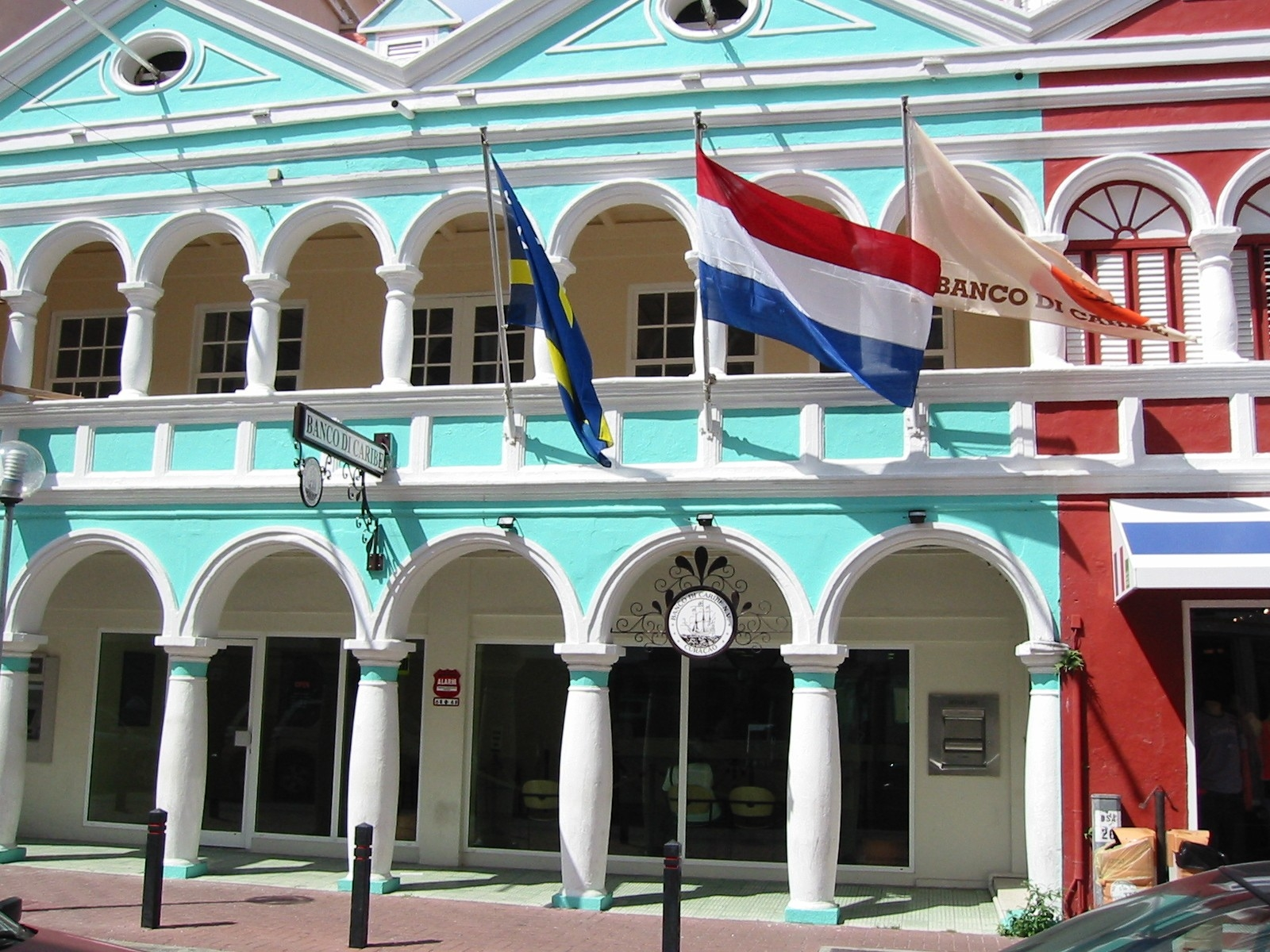
Banco di Caribe

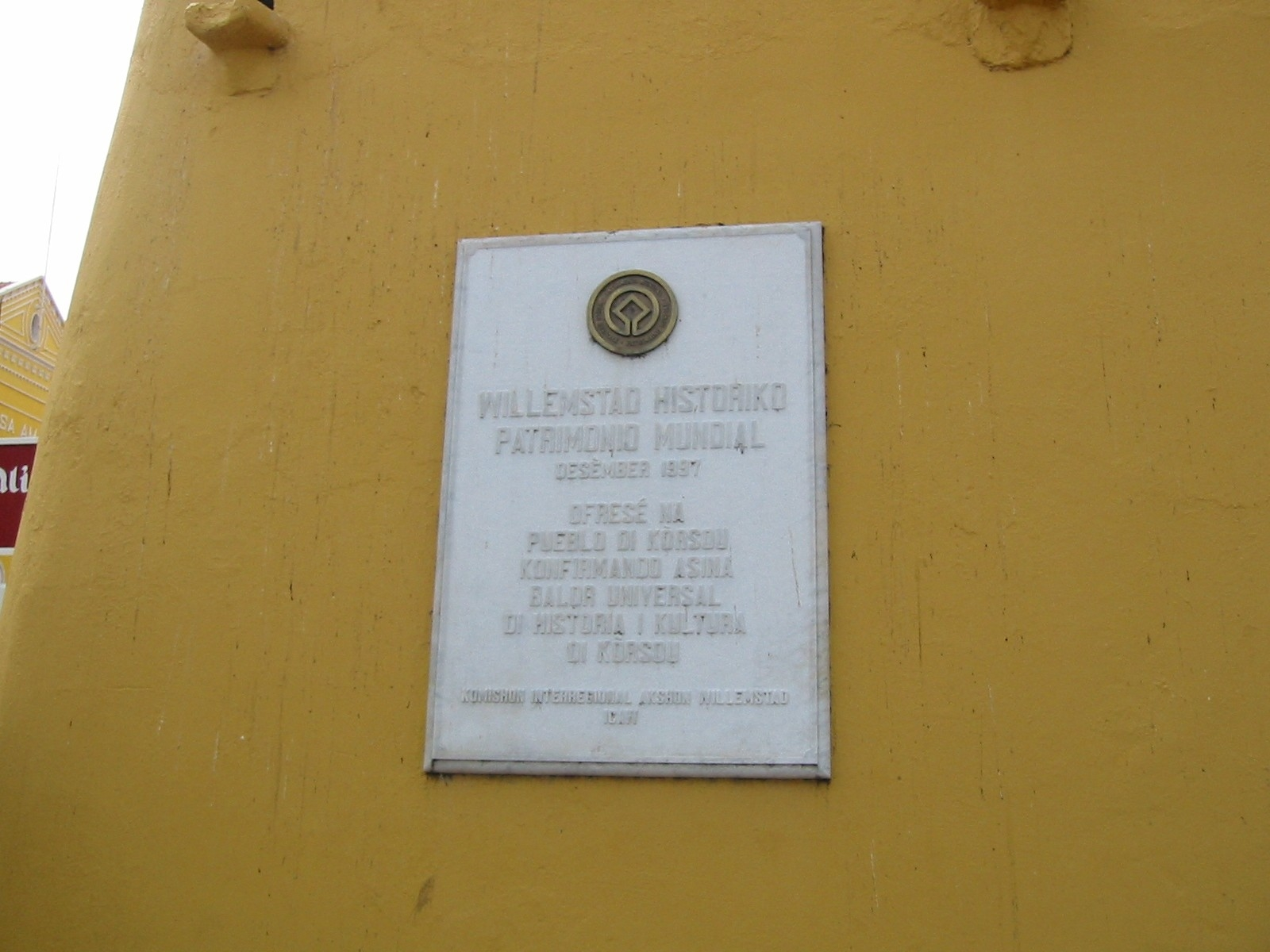
Historic Area of Willemstad, Inner City and Harbour was declared World Heritage Site by UNESCO in 1997

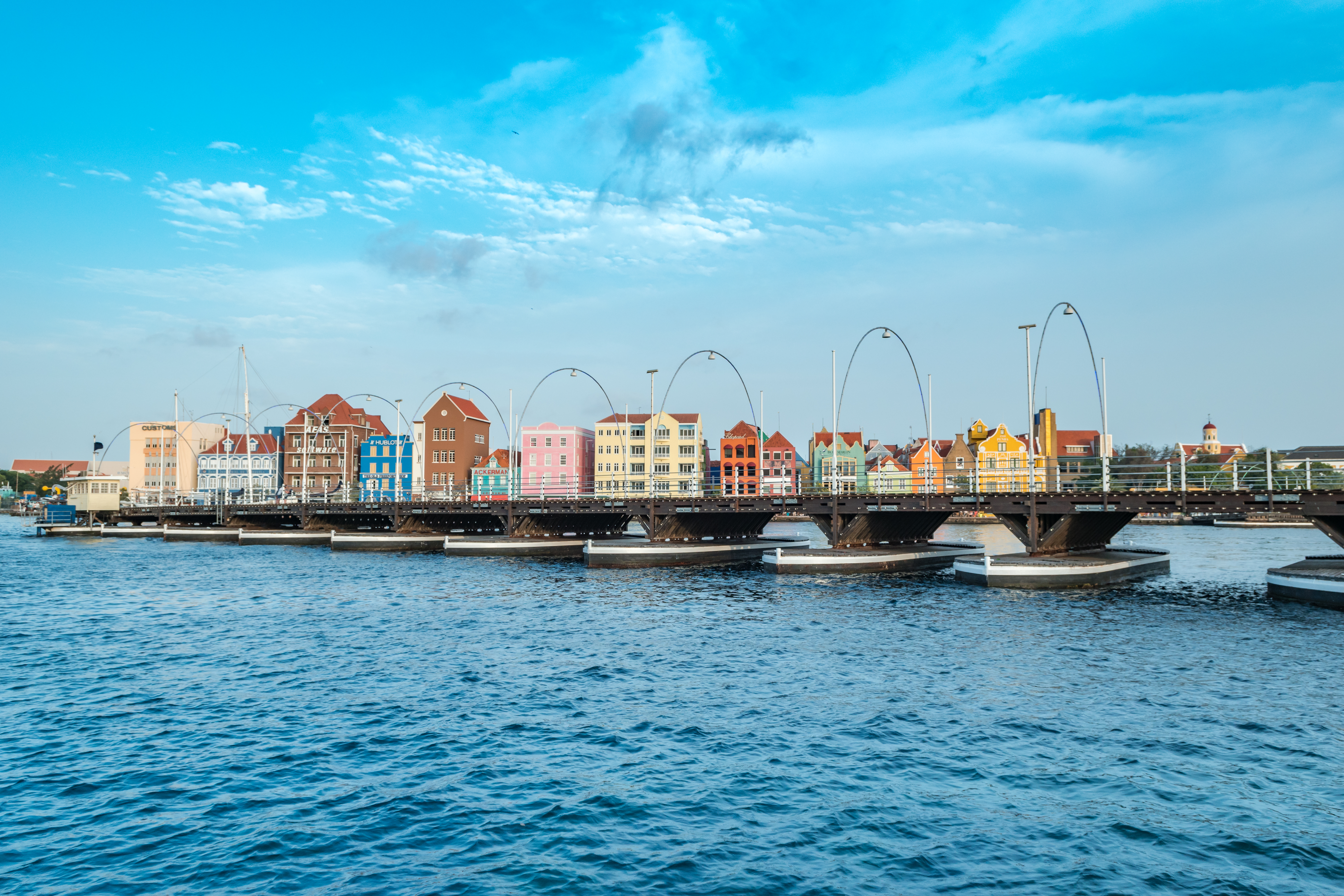
Queen Emma floating bridge in Willemstad

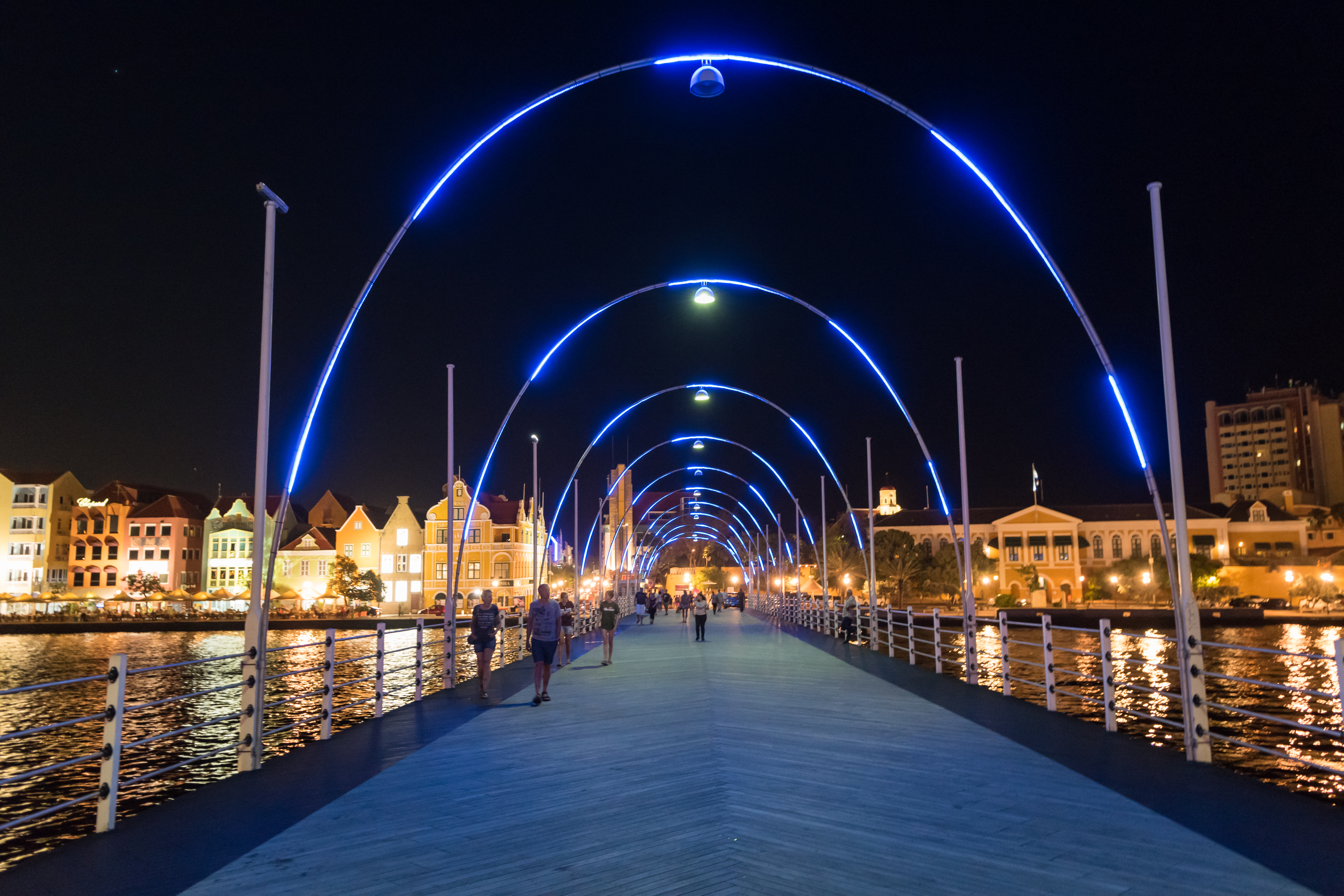
Queen Emma Bridge by night

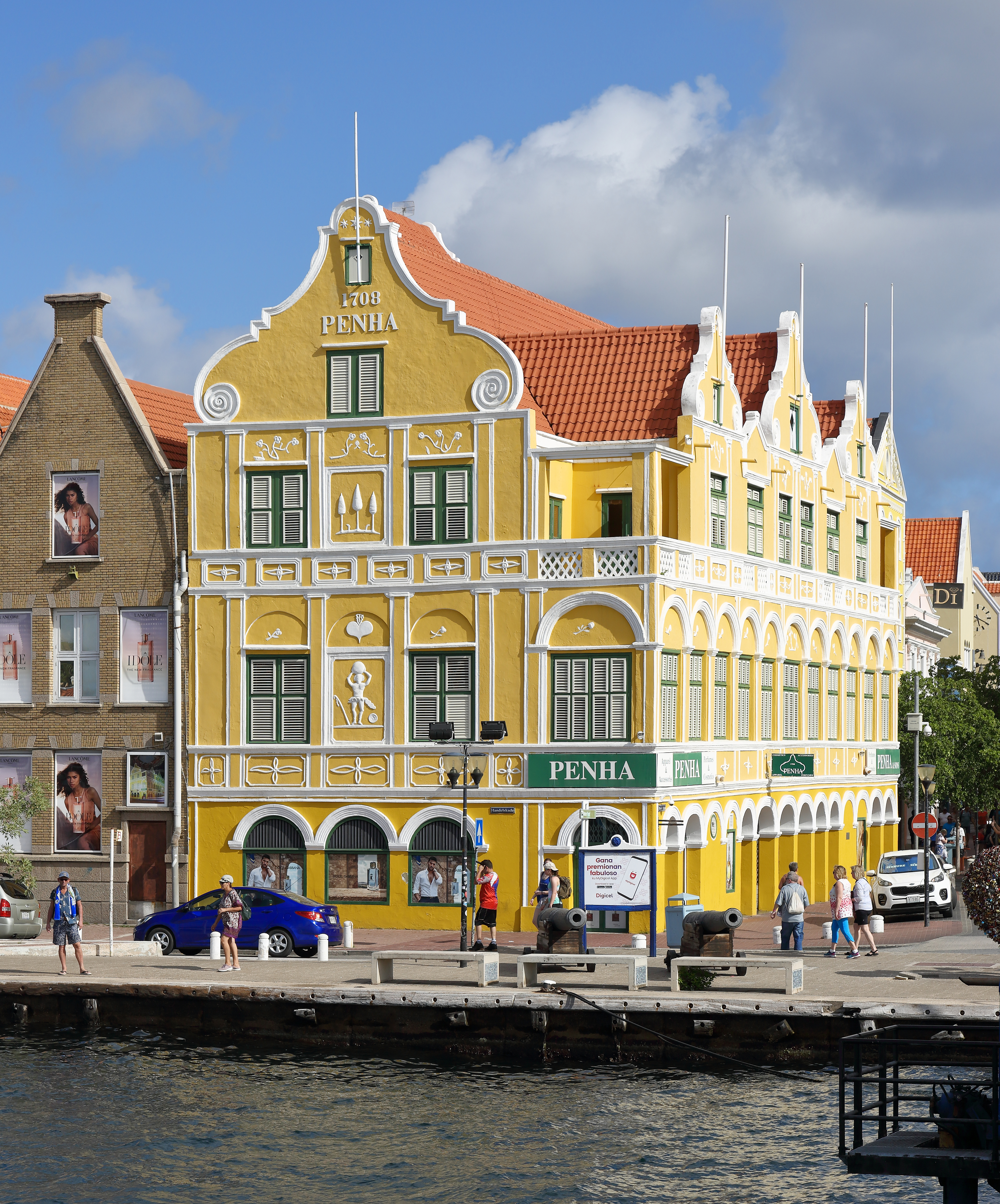
Penha Building, built in 1708

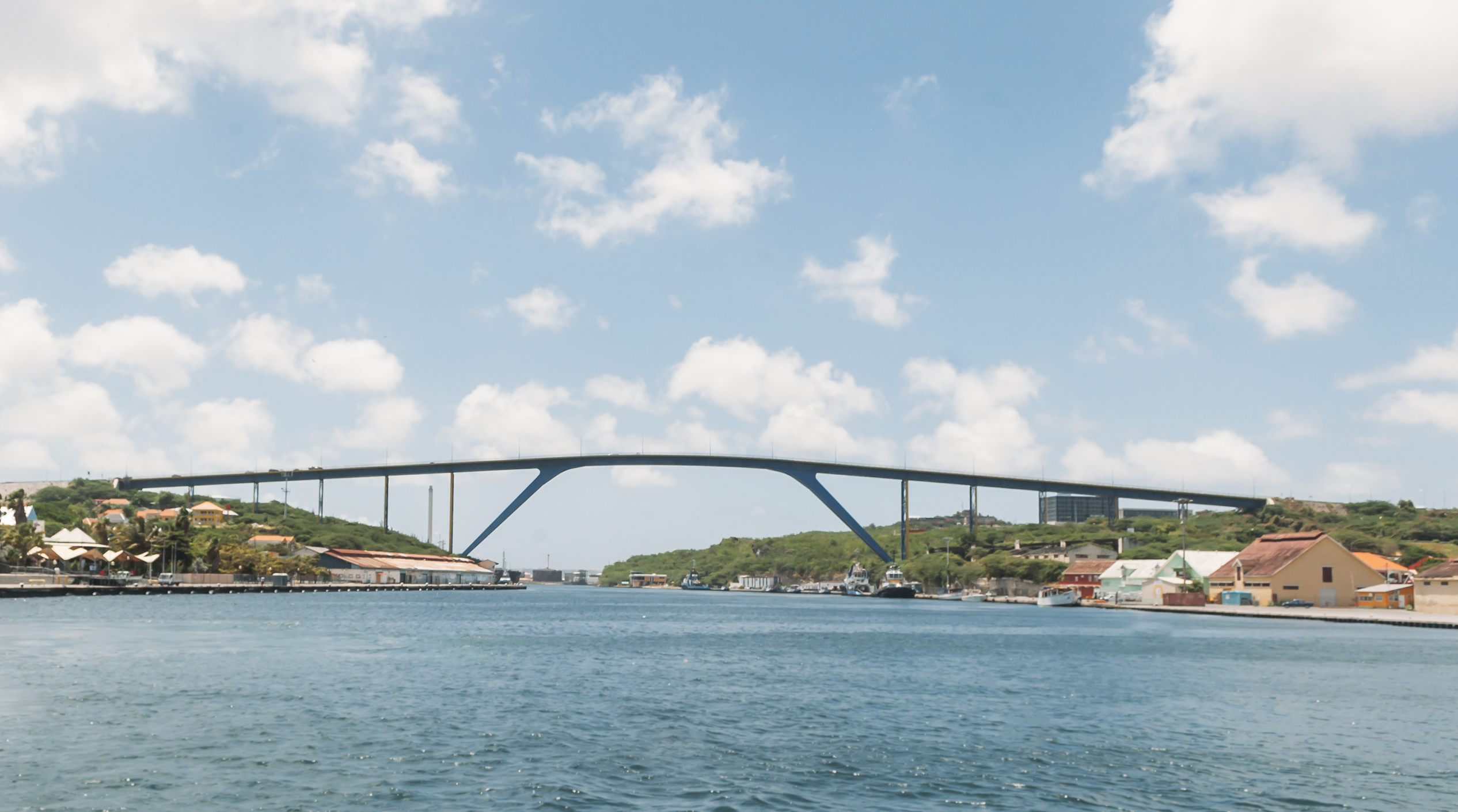
The Queen Juliana Bridge over St. Anna Bay in Willemstad, Curaçao

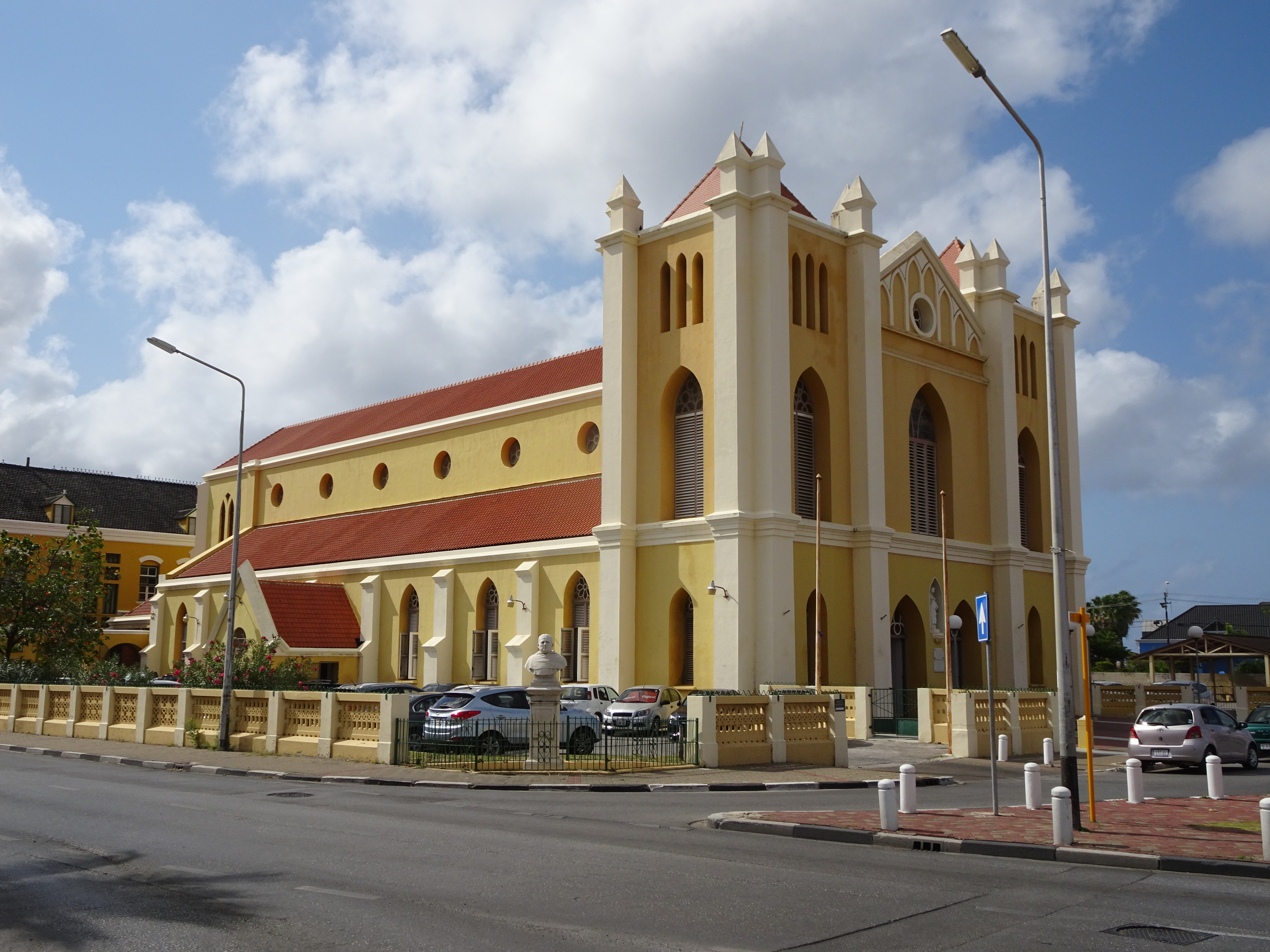
Queen of the Most Holy Rosary Cathedral

== Bibliography ==
- Benjamins, Herman Daniël; Snelleman, Johannes (1917). Encyclopaedie van Nederlandsch West-Indië (in Dutch). Leiden: Martinus Nijhoff Publishers.
