= Maduro Holding =

Holding company of Maduro Group

Maduro Holding B.V.
- Type: Private
- Industry: Shipping, Logistics, Real Estate, Tourism
- Founded: 1837
- Founders: Salomon Elias Levy (S.E.L.) Maduro
- Headquarters: Willemstad, Curaçao

Maduro Holding B.V. is the holding company of the Maduro Group, a Dutch Caribbean business with interests in shipping services, logistics, and real estate.

== History ==
S.E.L. Maduro was founded in 1837 by Salomon Elias Levy Maduro as a maritime business in the port of Willemstad, Curaçao. Its early activities included bunkering services for vessels calling at the port, including the supply of coal.

Following the opening of the Panama Canal and the development of the Venezuelan oil industry in the nearby Maracaibo Basin, the port of Willemstad became a regional energy and maritime hub. As Curaçao’s port economy expanded, S.E.L. Maduro & Sons developed beyond its original shipping activities into port agency, cargo handling, bunkering, logistics, freight forwarding, and related maritime services.

In 1916, local financier Joseph "Shon Jojo" Alvarez-Correa, with the financial backing of S.E.L. Maduro & Sons, established Maduro's Bank, the island's first commercial bank. In 1932, Maduro's Bank merged with Curiel's Bank to form Maduro & Curiel's Bank.

A notable member of the Maduro family was George Maduro (1916–1945), who became a decorated Dutch resistance fighter during World War II and is commemorated by Madurodam in The Hague.
