= Villa Esche =

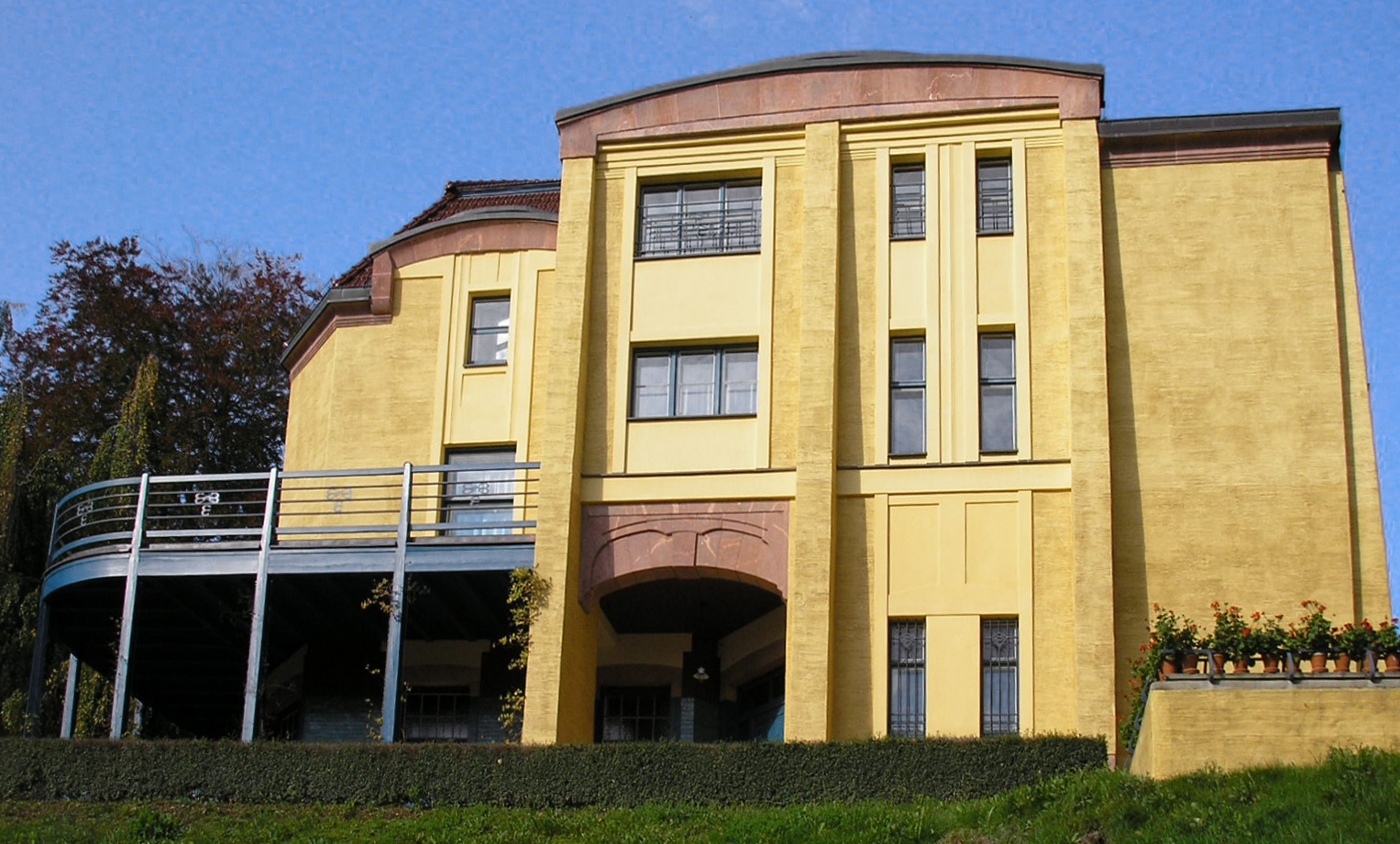
- Villa Esche in Chemnitz, Germany
- Interactive map of the Villa Esche area

General information
- Type: Villa
- Architectural style: Art Nouveau
- Location: Helbersdorf, Parkstrasse 58, 09120 Chemnitz, Germany
- Coordinates: 50.815°N 12.9011°E
- Current tenants: Henry van de Velde Museum
- Completed: 1902/1903, extended 1911
- Renovated: 1998-2001
- Landlord: Grundstücks- und Gebäudewirtschafts-Gesellschaft m.b.H. (GGG)

Technical details
- Floor count: 2

Design and construction
- Architect: Henry van de Velde

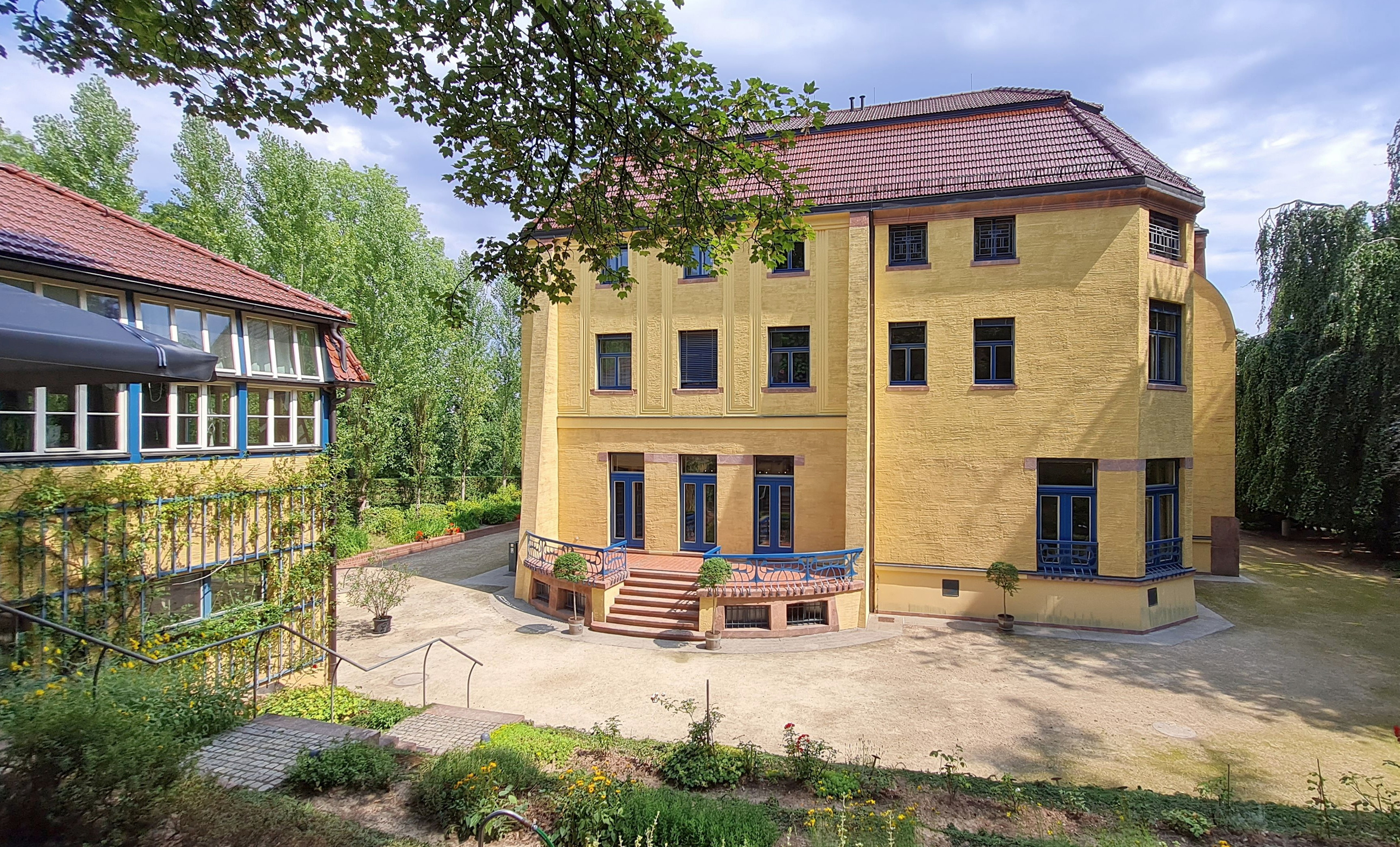
Villa Esche (rear side), 2022

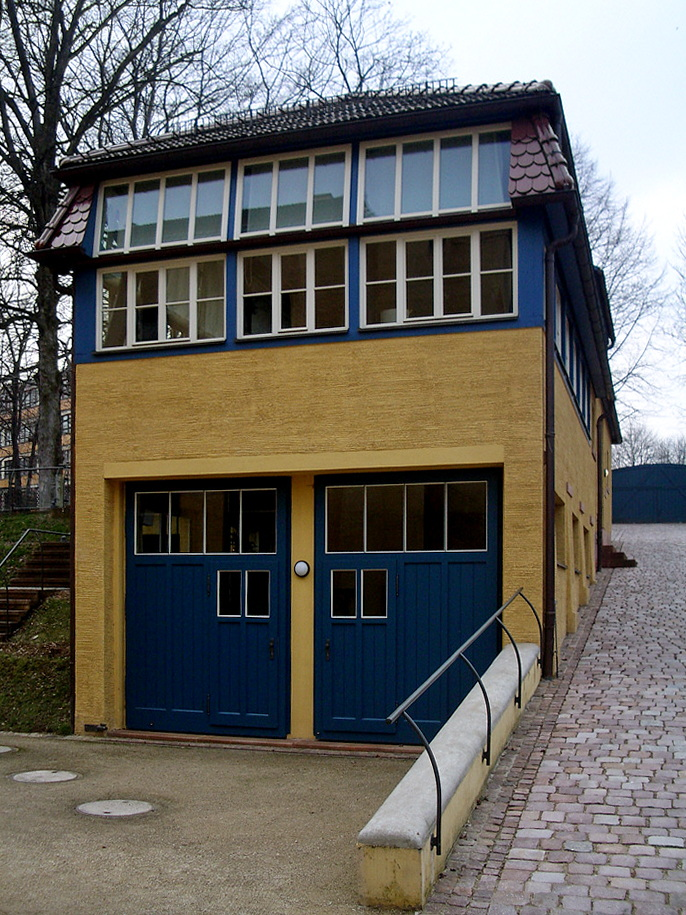
Carriage house for two automobiles, 2005

The Villa Esche in the Chemnitz locality of Helbersdorf in Saxony, Germany, is an Art Nouveau villa designed and built by the Belgian architect and designer Henry van de Velde (1863–1957) in 1902/1903 and extended in 1911. The house for the textile entrepreneur Herbert Esche (1874–1962) and his family is considered van de Velde's first commission in Germany, and thus also the begin of modern architecture in Chemnitz. The villa is a Gesamtkunstwerk (total artwork) in the sense of Art Nouveau. Furniture, interior textiles, and everyday objects, all the way down to clothing, are part of it. The small park surrounding the villa was probably designed by van de Velde's wife Maria Séthe. The Esche and van de Velde families were friends for decades. After his expropriation in 1945, Herbert Esche lived the rest of his life in Küsnacht in Switzerland, like Henry van de Velde, where the two visited each other again and again.

== History ==
The villa was the seat of the Chemnitz Soviet military commander in 1945, served as a residence from 1947, was used by the Ministry for State Security from 1952, was an educational institution from 1964 and stood empty from 1989. It was renovated and rebuilt between 1998 and 2001 by the architect Werner Wendisch and partly with the architect Karl-Heinz Barth. Today, the building houses a Henry van de Velde Museum (concept: Klaus-Jürgen Sembach) as part of the Kunstsammlungen Chemnitz (Chemnitz Art Collections); here, mainly parts of the original furnishings of the house, also designed by van de Velde, are presented. With the largely original furnished former dining room and the music salon, the museum gives an impression of the original ambience of the "living spaces" designed by van de Velde. Several other rooms, including a newly created one in the attic, can be used by the public. The owner of the property is the Grundstücks- und Gebäudewirtschafts-Gesellschaft m.b.H. (GGG), a subsidiary of the city of Chemnitz. Readings and concerts take place; weddings and wedding celebrations are also possible. The location is also used as a conference center for smaller groups. The carriage house or orangery houses a restaurant.

== Quotes ==
Henry van de Velde gilt als Künstler des Jugendstils, entwickelte dabei aber spezifische Ausdrucksformen, deren Linearität strenger wirkt als die florale Variante des Jugendstils. Die Villa Esche ist ein hervorragendes Beispiel dafür.

[Henry van de Velde is considered an Jugendstil artist, yet developed specific forms of expression whose linearity appears stricter than the floral variant of Art Nouveau. The Villa Esche is an excellent example of this.]

— Jens Kassner

His designs reflected the fast fading Art Nouveau style giving way to the Bauhaus, with van de Velde being one of its leading pioneers.

— Iconic Houses.org

== Other usage ==
The villa is used for concerts by artists-in-residence. Since 2005, these have been the pianist Vladimir Stoupel, Wolfgang Hentrich (2006), the Chinese sheng-player and composer Wu Wei (2007), Peter Bruns (2008) and Kolja Lessing (2009) and, in 2010, the Icelandic violinist Judith Ingolfsson.
