= Mazel Tov =

"Mazel tov" is a Jewish phrase used to express congratulations.

Mazel Tov may also refer to:

- Mazel Tov (play)
- Mazel Tov (film)
- Mazel Tov (book)
- "Khosn kale mazel tov" the Yiddish song
