= Suzanne Perlman =

Dutch Hungarian painter (1922–2020)

- Born: Suzanne Sternberg; 18 October 1922; Budapest, Hungary
- Died: 2 August 2020 (aged 97); London, England
- Known for: Painting
- Movement: Expressionism
- Awards: Order of Orange-Nassau
- Website: suzanneperlman.co.uk

Suzanne Perlman (18 October 1922 – 2 August 2020) was a Hungarian-Dutch visual artist known for her expressionist portraits and landscape paintings. Her bold use of colour has its origins in her early paintings of the tropical island of Curaçao, where she moved with her husband in 1940 to escape Nazi persecution. Her expressionist style developed under the tutelage of Austrian master Oskar Kokoschka in the late 1950s, with whom she worked in Salzburg in the 1960s. Reviewing a 1993 Exhibition as his Critic’s Choice in The Times, John Russell Taylor, art critic and author, wrote that "(Perlman) captures the particular feel of the place while abating none of her expressionist dash".

Perlman studied at Columbia University School of the Arts, Instituto Allende and at Saint Martin's School of Art.

== Life and work ==
=== Early life ===
Perlman née Sternberg was born in Budapest in October 1922 into a Jewish family. She lived with her brother, Sigmund, and her two parents, Abraham and Elisabeth Sternberg. The family owned an art and antiques gallery and Abraham had an avid interest in the works of young Hungarian artists, discovering and promoting many of them, including Pál Fried. While still at school, Suzanne would help her parents to sort and catalogue a collection of museum postcards by celebrated artists – an experience that Perlman saw as her early training and inspiration. She left school at 13 after her father died.

In 1939, at the age of 17, she married Heinz Perlman, a businessman, and moved with him to Rotterdam, Holland. Soon after arriving, tensions in Europe were rising. After coming in with the lowest tender to supply grain to French troops behind the Maginot Line, Heinz was summoned by telegram to Paris to urgently negotiate the deal and was told to bring his wife. Suzanne described this call as the one that saved their lives. They arrived in Paris on 11 May 1940, three days before the German bombing of Rotterdam – "One of the first hits of the Nazi bombardment of Rotterdam was my husband’s office building". Amidst the chaos, the couple managed to reach Bordeaux and board what was to be the last vessel to leave Europe on the day of the French Armistice of 22 June 1940. In August 1940, they arrived in Curaçao and settled in its capital, Willemstad.

=== Early works and Curaçao ===
Unable to communicate in Papiamento, the local language, Perlman expressed her admiration for the island and its people through art. She gravitated toward portraying ordinary working people of the island such as street vendors, domino players in the street or ritual dancers. For some years, with her husband, she ran an antiques business; her studio being in the attic above. Perlman had her first major solo exhibition at the Curaçao Museum in 1961.

While living in Curaçao in the 1960s, Perlman was selected to attend a workshop run by Oskar Kokoschka in Salzburg. After the workshop, she was selected to work alongside him in his studio which had a seminal impact on her work and expressionist style. Suzanne is quoted saying of Kokoschka: "He had an amazing dynamic and said to me 'Technique you can learn, but the moment of vision cannot be taught'".

=== New York ===
From the early 1950s, and until her husband died, the couple lived in New York City where Suzanne studied at the Art Students League of New York, first in 1955.

Likely immersed in the burgeoning abstract expressionist movement, Perlman painted her first known abstract expressionist work, Untitled, in 1950. Later in New York she was a pupil of Sidney Gross, a painter, from whom she drew inspiration and produced abstract works still brimming with the Caribbean palette of the Dutch Antilles.

=== London ===
Perlman moved to London in the 1980s to be closer to her family after the death of her husband in 1983. Moving to London was a renaissance in her life and her art: "I began to paint immediately. As an outsider, there was an amazing quality in what I saw – I had to communicate this sense of wonder."

In 2014, David Glasser curated the exhibition Suzanne Perlman, Painting London, at the Ben Uri Gallery in London, (30 April – 17 May 2014). Glasser described her London work as "part Arcadia, part metropolis, part fantasy and part documentary. Her subjects include summer revels and autumn blooms in London’s parks; traffic-laden busy thoroughfares; Covent Garden nightlife; booksellers on a glowing Southbank, and architectural vistas of the Houses of Parliament, Trafalgar Square and St. Paul’s."

In 2018, Perlman had her first retrospective exhibition in London held at the Dutch Centre. It was awarded the Critic's Choice by Jackie Wullschlager of the Financial Times who described Perlman's work as "expressive, visionary [and] deeply engaged with the modernist tradition".

== Collections ==
Works by Perlman are present in major museum collections, including:

- Rijksmuseum, Amsterdam
- Stedelijk Museum Amsterdam
- Curaçao Museum
- Parliamentary Art Collection (House of Lords)
- Ben Uri Gallery, London
- Museum of London
- Dohány Street Synagogue (Jewish Museum of Budapest)
- Jewish Museum London
- Joods Historisch Museum, Amsterdam
- Museum Gouda, Holland
- Ruth Borchard Collection
- Queen Beatrix, the Queen Mother, Netherlands Royal Collection
- El Museo del Barrio, New York
