= Herbert Esche =

German entrepreneur (1874-1962)

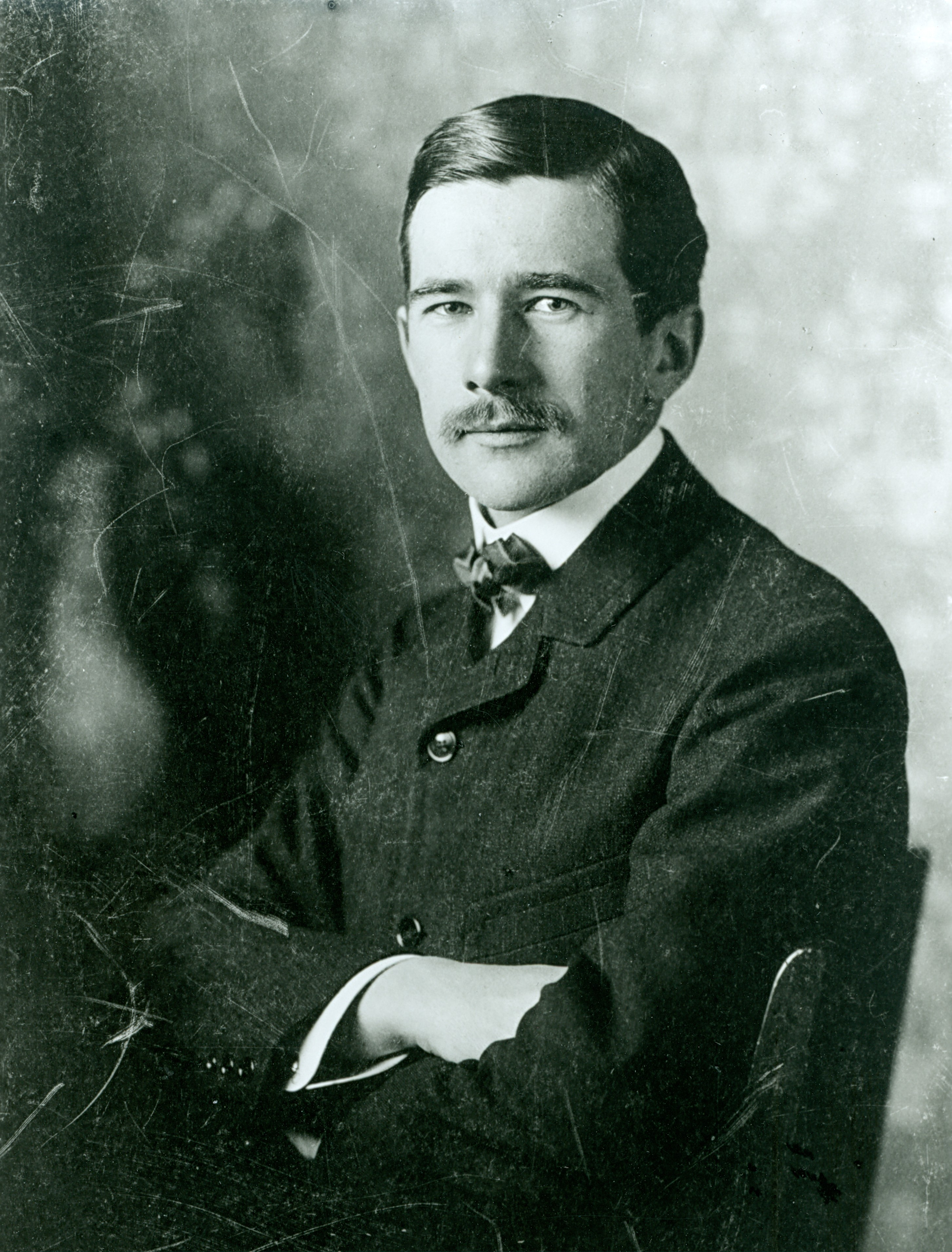
- Herbert Eugen Esche (1898)
- Born: July 27, 1874; Chemnitz
- Died: July 18, 1962 (aged 87); Küsnacht near Zurich
- Occupation: Entrepreneur in the textile industry

Herbert Eugen Esche (born July 27, 1874 in Chemnitz; died July 18, 1962 in Küsnacht near Zurich) was a German entrepreneur in the textile industry and patron of the arts. Henry van de Velde built Villa Esche on his behalf.

== Life and work ==
After the death of their father, Otto Moritz Eugen Esche became co-owner and managing director of the Moritz Samuel Esche hosiery factory in Chemnitz together with his brother Fritz Eugen Esche (1876–1953). The family business, which had existed since the 17th century, was moved from Limbach to Chemnitz in 1870 for better rail connections.

At the end of the 19th century, Herbert Esche met the Belgian Henry van de Velde in Paris, and in 1902, Esche commissioned him to build a villa on Parkstrasse, on the outskirts of Chemnitz. Esche lived there with his wife and two children after its completion in 1903.

Today Villa Esche houses the Henry van de Velde Museum, a branch of the Chemnitz Art Collections.

Esche invited the artist Edvard Munch to Chemnitz in 1905. He portrayed the family and six portraits and a landscape painting were created. Five of them are now part of a foundation set up specifically for this purpose in Zurich.

At the end of 1945, Herbert Esche left Chemnitz and moved to Küsnacht, Switzerland, to live with his daughter, where he died in 1962.

== Literature ==
- Georg Brühl: Jugendstil in Chemnitz. Die Villa Esche von Henry van de Velde. Bayerische Vereinsbank, München 1990.
- Tilo Richter: Herbert Eugen Esche – Ein Lebensbild. Passage Verlag, Leipzig 2001, ISBN 3-932900-63-4.
- Katharina Metz, Tilo Richter, Priska Schmückle von Minckwitz: Henry van de Veldes Villa Esche in Chemnitz. Birkhäuser Verlag, Basel et al. 2003, ISBN 3-7643-6991-4.
