= Congratulations! =

1975 opera by Mieczysław Weinberg

- Opera by Mieczysław Weinberg
- Native title: Russian: Поздравляем!, romanized: Pozdravlyayem!
- Librettist: Weinberg
- Language: Russian
- Based on: Mazel Tov by Sholem Aleichem

Congratulations! (Russian: Поздравляем!, romanized: Pozdravlyayem!, Op. 111) is a 1975 opera by Mieczysław Weinberg to his own Russian libretto after the Yiddish play Mazel Tov by Sholem Aleichem. The plot, closely following the text of Sholem Aleichem's play, emphasises the class conflict to placate Soviet censors, for whom otherwise a Jewish topic may have proved problematic. The opera premiered in Moscow in 1983. Present at the premiere was Vladimir Stoupel, who conducted the premiere outside Russia at the Konzerthaus Berlin in 2012.

== Recording ==
Wir gratulieren! - in German, version for chamber ensemble by Henry Koch, Katia Guedes, Anna Gütter, Olivia Saragosa, Jeff Martin, Robert Elibay-Hartong, Kammerakademie Potsdam, Vladimir Stoupel. Oehms, live from the Konzerthaus Berlin 2012, released 2020.
