= Garage (residential) =

Walled, roofed structure for storing vehicles

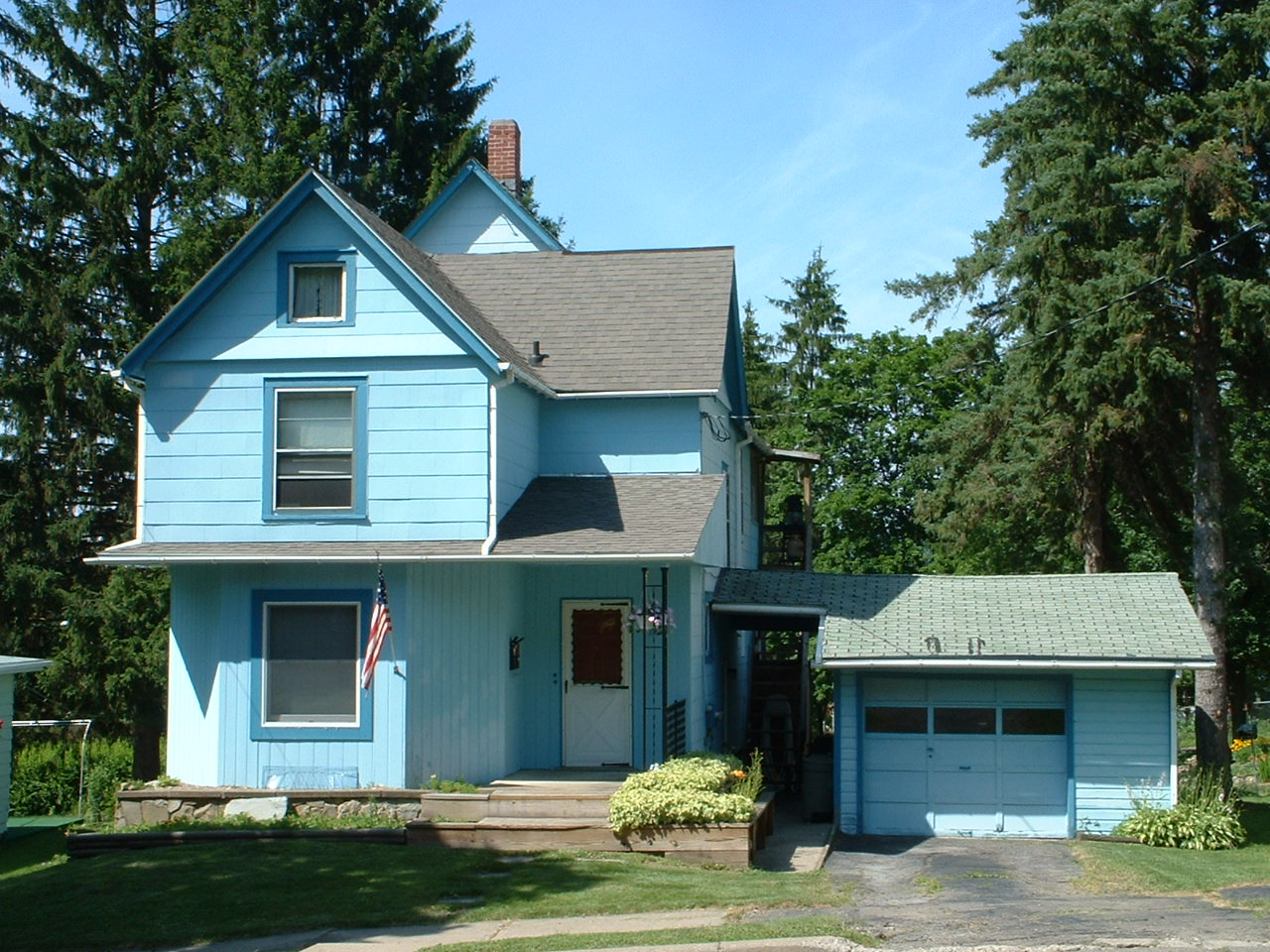
Residential house with garage in upstate New York, U.S. in 2002

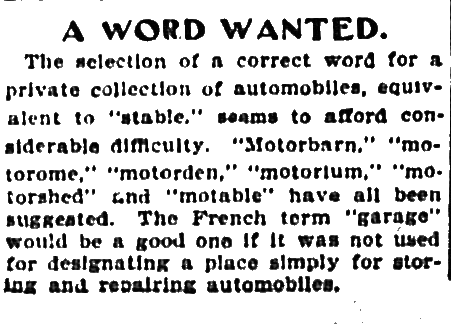
A 1901 newspaper article discussing a name for a private collection of automobiles, which mentions the word "garage" as being a possible choice except that that word was already in use in the broader sense of a place to store and repair them. Today the word garage has both senses; for example, Jay Leno's Garage is a series about his collection and other interesting collections, not merely the buildings that contain them.

A residential garage (UK: /ˈɡærɑːʒ, -rɑːdʒ, -rɪdʒ/ GARR-ahzh, -ahj, -ij, US: /ɡəˈrɑːʒ, -rɑːdʒ/ gə-RAHZH, -RAHJ) is a walled, roofed structure with a door for storing a vehicle or vehicles that may be part of or attached to a home ("attached garage"), or a separate outbuilding or shed ("detached garage"). Residential garages typically have space for one or two cars, although three-car garages are used. When a garage is attached to a house, the garage typically has an entry door into the house, called the person door or man door, in contrast with the wider and taller door for vehicles, called the garage door, which can be opened to permit the entry and exit of a vehicle and then closed to secure the vehicle. A garage protects a vehicle from precipitation, and, if it is equipped with a locking garage door, it also protects the vehicle(s) from theft and vandalism. Most garages also serve multifunction duty as workshops for a variety of projects, including painting, woodworking, and assembly. Garages also may be used for other purposes as well, such as storage or entertainment.

Some garages have an electrical mechanism to automatically open or close the garage door when the homeowner presses a button on a small remote control, along with a detector that stops the movement of the garage if something is in the way of closing. Some garages have enough space, even with cars inside, for the storage of items such as bicycles or a lawnmower; in some cases, there may even be enough space for a workshop or a man cave. Garages that are attached to a house may be built with the same external materials and roofing as the house. Garages that are not connected to the home may use a different style of construction from the house. Often in the Southern and rural United States garages not attached to the home and made from a timber frame with sheet metal coverings are known as "pole barns", but usually serve the same purpose as what is called a garage elsewhere. In some places, the term is used synonymously with "carport", though that term normally describes a structure that, while roofed, is not completely enclosed. A carport protects the vehicle to some degree from inclement weather, but it does not protect the vehicle from theft or vandalism.

The word garage, introduced to English in 1902, originates from the French word garer, meaning shelter. By 1908 the architect Charles Harrison Townsend was commenting in The Builder magazine that "for the home of the car, we very largely use the French word 'garage', alternatively with what I think the more desirable English equivalent of 'motor house'". Today the word is polysemic because it can refer to a collection of vehicles as well as the building that contains them.

== Residential garage insulation ==
In northern climates, temperatures inside an uninsulated attached residential garage can decrease to freezing levels during the winter. Temperatures inside an uninsulated attached garage in temperate climates can reach uncomfortable levels during summer months. Extreme temperatures can be a source of energy waste and discomfort in adjoining living areas, due to heat transfer between the garage and those areas. Homes with an attached garage often experience this "interface" problem. Insulating the outside of the building against the elements without extending the insulation to the wall separating the garage from the house, and/or the other garage walls and roof, can be a costly mistake.

== In Australia ==
Australian homes typically have a two, one and a half or double car garage, with some newer houses having a triple garage, with one double door and one single door. Prior to the 1970s most of them were detached from the house, usually set further back with the driveway leading up past the side of the house, common with old fibreboard houses, but not uncommon with earlier brick houses. The most common doors on these garages were either two wooden barn style doors with a standard sized access door on the side of the garage or the B&D Rolla Door, which is described below.

The most common garage door to date in Australia is the B&D Rolla Door, having been around since 1956 and still in heavy use today. They are a corrugated flexible but strong sheet steel door, sliding up tracks and rolling around a drum mounted above the door opening on the inside of the garage. These come in manual and remote controlled electric (known as the Control-a-Door), with conversion kits available. Locking is provided by a key lock in the centre of the door moving two square sliding lock bars in and out of holes in the door tracks, locking and unlocking it, or by the solenoid lock in the automatic motor.

Newer homes feature more American styled tilting panel lift doors which slide up onto a track on the ceiling via a motor and chain drive. Since the late 1970s most if not all garages are attached, and throughout the 80's it became more common to have an access door into the home from the garage where design permitted, whereas it is commonplace now. Most older unit (apartment) blocks in Australia have garages on the ground floor accessible through a common hallway and access doors, all leading into a common driveway. Newer ones now have underground parking.

Australia has strict guidelines in place when building a home and the garage size must conform to the Australian Standards. The minimum size for a single garage is 3.0 m × 5.4 m (9.8 ft × 17.7 ft) and a double is 5.4 m × 5.4 m (17.7 ft × 17.7 ft). However, to comfortably fit two cars in a double garage it is typical to have a size of 6.0 m × 6.0 m (19.7 ft × 19.7 ft).

== In the United Kingdom ==
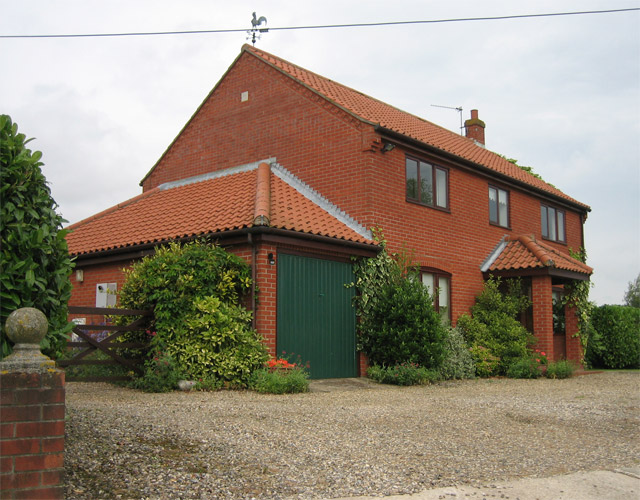
UK house with attached garage

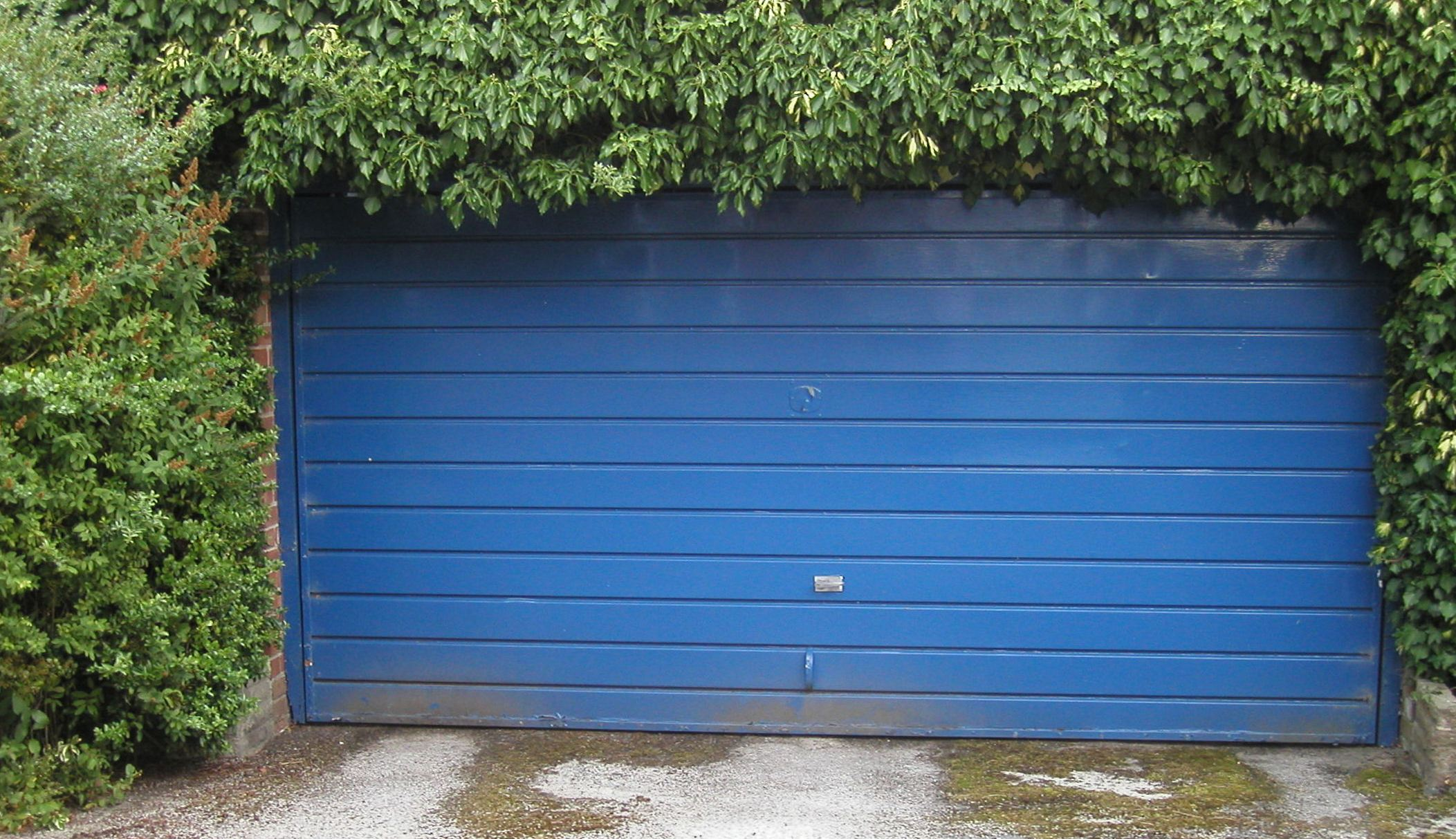
Up-and-over garage door

British homes featuring a garage typically have a single or double garage either built into the main building, detached within the grounds (often in the back garden), or in a communal area.

Traditionally, garage doors were wooden, opening either as two leaves or sliding horizontally. Newer garages are fitted with metal up-and-over doors. Increasingly, in new homes, such doors are electrically operated.

Typically, a small British single garage is 8 by 16 feet (2.4 m × 4.9 m), a medium single garage is 9 by 18 feet (2.7 m × 5.5 m), and a large single garage is 10 by 20 feet (3.0 m × 6.1 m). Family sedans have become bigger than they were in the past, so the larger size has become a preferred option. A typical large family car like the Ford Mondeo is about 15 by 6 feet (4.6 m × 1.8 m), meaning that even with the larger size garage, it is necessary to park to one side to be able to open the driver's door wide enough to enter or exit the vehicle.

In the early days of the motor car, a garage played an important role in protecting the vehicle from the weather (particularly so as to reduce rust). It was also the case that early motor cars started more easily when they were warm, so that keeping them in a garage rather than outside made it easier to get the engine going in the morning. Modern motor cars, however, are very well protected against rust, and modern engines start with no difficulty even in very cold conditions.

=== Early history ===
The common term for these structures in the first decades of the 20th century was motor house. Many garages from before 1914 were pre-fabricated, typically by companies such as Norwich manufacturer Boulton & Paul Ltd. The style was usually in keeping with that of the house and its locale, however, they were mainly of timber construction and few have survived.

E. Keynes Purchase, "honorary architect" to what was to become the Royal Automobile Club, did a lot of work on them and recommended in The Car Illustrated in 1902, that they be of brick construction with cement floor, an inspection pit, good electric lighting and a pulley system for removing parts of the car (in the early days of motoring many car owners were mechanical and engineering enthusiasts).

The architecture of garages was ignored in the architectural journals despite famous architects such as Edwin Lutyens, Richard Barry Parker and Edgar Wood all designing garages for their wealthy clients. Charles Harrison Townsend was one of the few architects who put pen to paper (in The Builder in 1908) on the subject and recommended that the walls be glazed brick for ease of washing, air gratings to be low (petrol fumes are heavier than air), and drains half open to avoid build-up of gases.

By 1910 corrugated iron and asbestos were being used instead of wood and garages became less imposing. From 1912 speculatively built houses in London were being built with motor houses.

== In North America ==
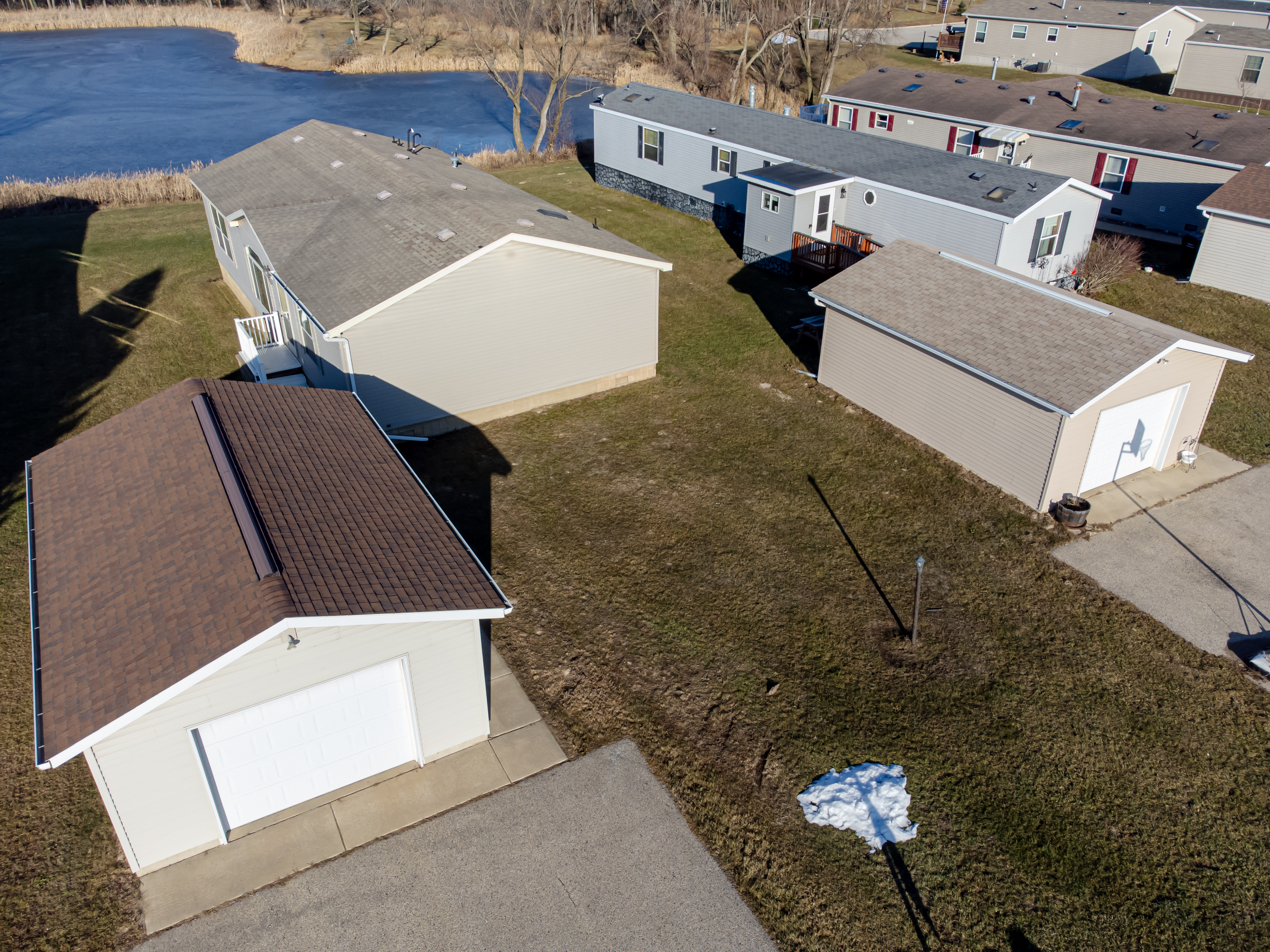
Mobile homes with detached single car garages in Tomah, Wisconsin in 2023

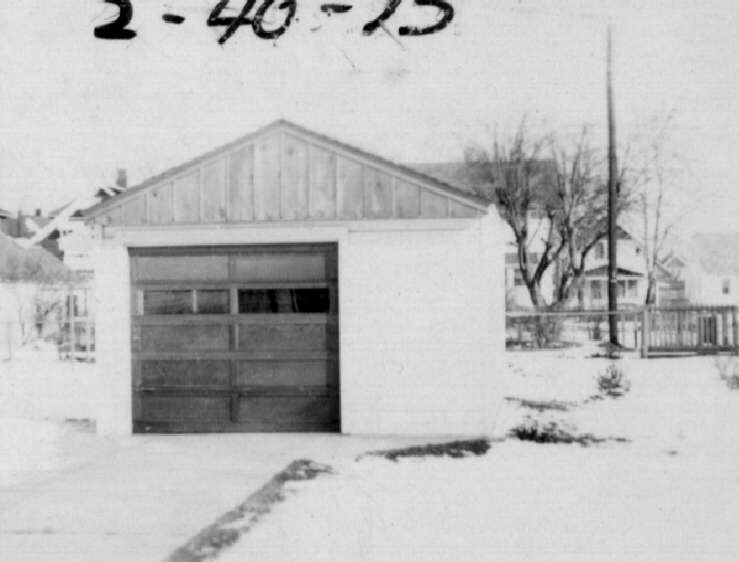
Circa 1955 detached residential garage seen in Toledo, Ohio

Many garage doors open upward using an electric chain drive, which can often be automatically controlled from inside the resident's vehicle with a small radio transmitter. Garages are connected to the nearest road with a driveway. Interior space for one or two cars is normal, and garages built after 1950 usually have a door that connects the garage directly to the interior of the house (an "attached garage"). Earlier garages were often detached and located in the back yard of the house, accessed either via a long driveway or from an alley.

In the past, garages were often separate buildings from the house ("detached garage"). On occasion, a garage would be built with an apartment above it, which could be rented out. As automobiles became more popular, the concept of attaching the garage directly to the home grew into a common practice. While a person with a separate garage must walk outdoors in every type of weather, a person with an attached garage has a much shorter walk inside a building.

Around the start of the 21st century, companies began offering "portable garages" in the United States. Typically, these garages are made of metal, wood or vinyl and do not connect to the house or other structure, much like the garage built before 1950. This portable garages usually have a strongly reinforced floor to hold a heavy vehicle. Garages are also produced as composite fabric garages with metal frames that are lightweight and portable garage compared to traditional brick-and-mortar or metal garage structures.

Over the past fifteen years, the portable garage has further evolved into a modular garage or a partially prefabricated structure. The modular garage comes from a factory that assembles the garage in two sections and combines the two sections on location. Partially prefabricated garages are often larger and might even include an attic space or a second floor. Sections of the garage are preassembled and then setup on site over a few days time. The Amish have become popular builders of portable, modular and partially prefabricated garages.

=== Common garage sizes in the United States ===
Garage sizes in the United States vary depending on the number of vehicles they are designed to accommodate. While dimensions can differ based on specific needs and local building codes, typical sizes are as follows:

- One-car garage: Usually 12 to 18 feet wide and 20 to 30 feet deep, with a total area of 240 to 540 square feet.
- Two-car garage: Commonly 20 to 24 feet wide, maintaining the same depth, and covering 360 to 660 square feet.
- Three-car garage: Typically 30 to 36 feet wide, providing 600 to 1,260 square feet of space.
- Four-car garage: The largest standard size, ranging from 40 to 48 feet wide, with a total area of 800 to 1,600 square feet.

These dimensions offer enough space not only for vehicles but also for storage and accessibility. Garage sizes may vary depending on design preferences, vehicle types, and additional space requirements.

=== Post frame garages ===
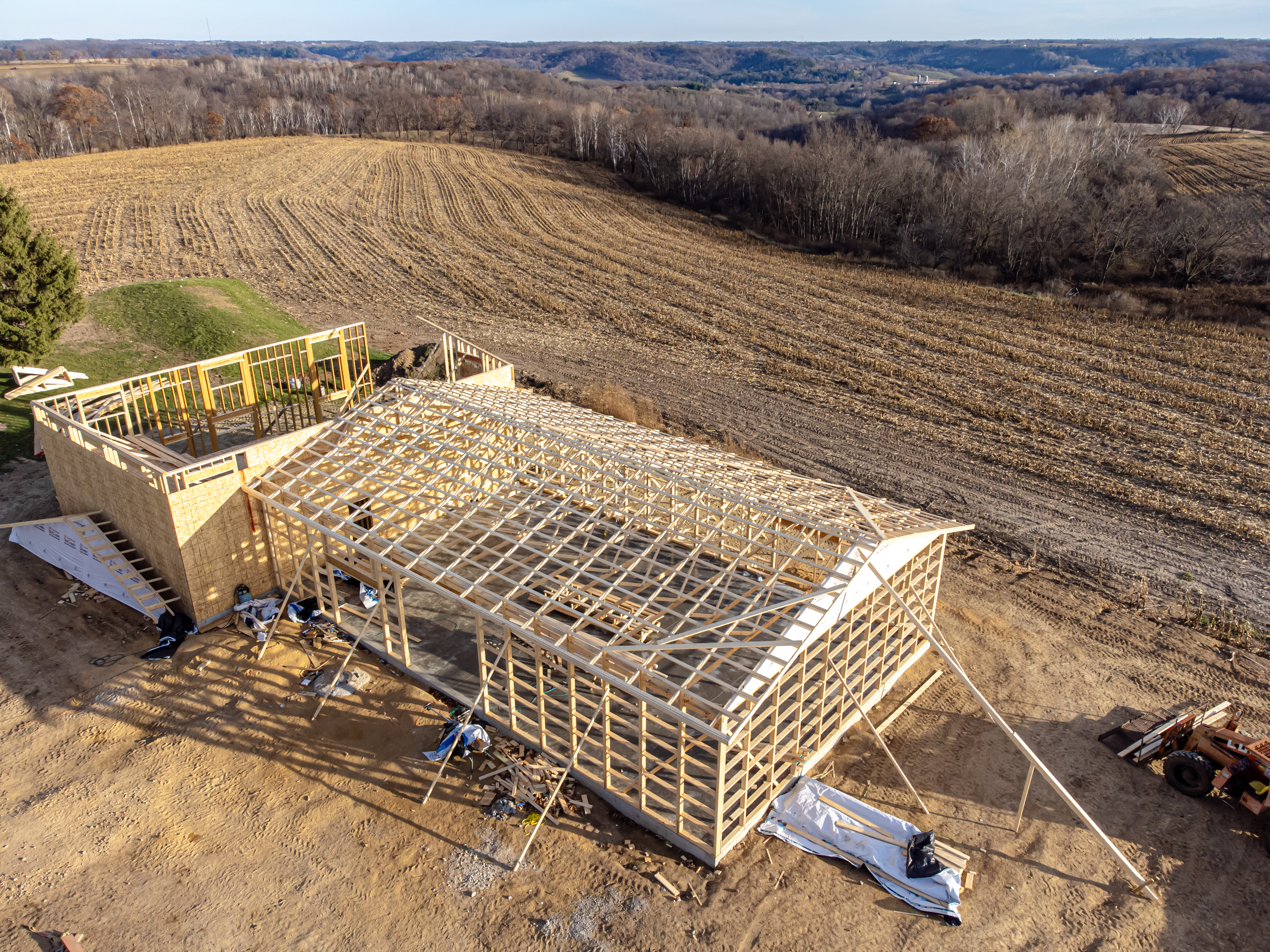
Post frame garage attached to traditional frame house

Often in more rural settings, detached post-frame garages are used to store farm and workshop equipment and can either be cold storage or insulated for warm storage.

== Notable garages ==
The first planned private garages appeared long before 1900. Early examples of planned public garages appeared at the same time. The first recorded public parking garage in the US (Electric Vehicle Company Garage, Chicago) was built in 1898, in the UK (Christal Palace Garage, London) in 1900 and in Germany (Großgarage der Automüller G.m.b.H., Berlin-Wilmersdorf) in 1901.

Possibly the oldest existing garage in the United Kingdom is in Southport Lancashire. It was the first motor house or garage to be depicted in an English motoring journal and was in The Autocar of 7 October 1899. It was owned by Dr W.W. Barratt, a local doctor and motoring pioneer and specially designed for his house at 29 Park Crescent Hesketh Park. A two-storey building that matched the style of the house; the ground floor garage having a concrete floor, heating, electric lighting, an engine pit and was fully equipped. The motor house is now in residential use.

One of the oldest surviving private garages in Germany today is the 1903 finished Automobil-Remise (automobile carriage house) of Villa Esche by Henry van de Velde in Chemnitz. Carl Benz, the inventor of the automobile, had a tower built for himself in 1910, on the first floor a room for studying, on the ground floor car parking space. It still exists in Ladenburg, Germany.

== Gallery of examples ==
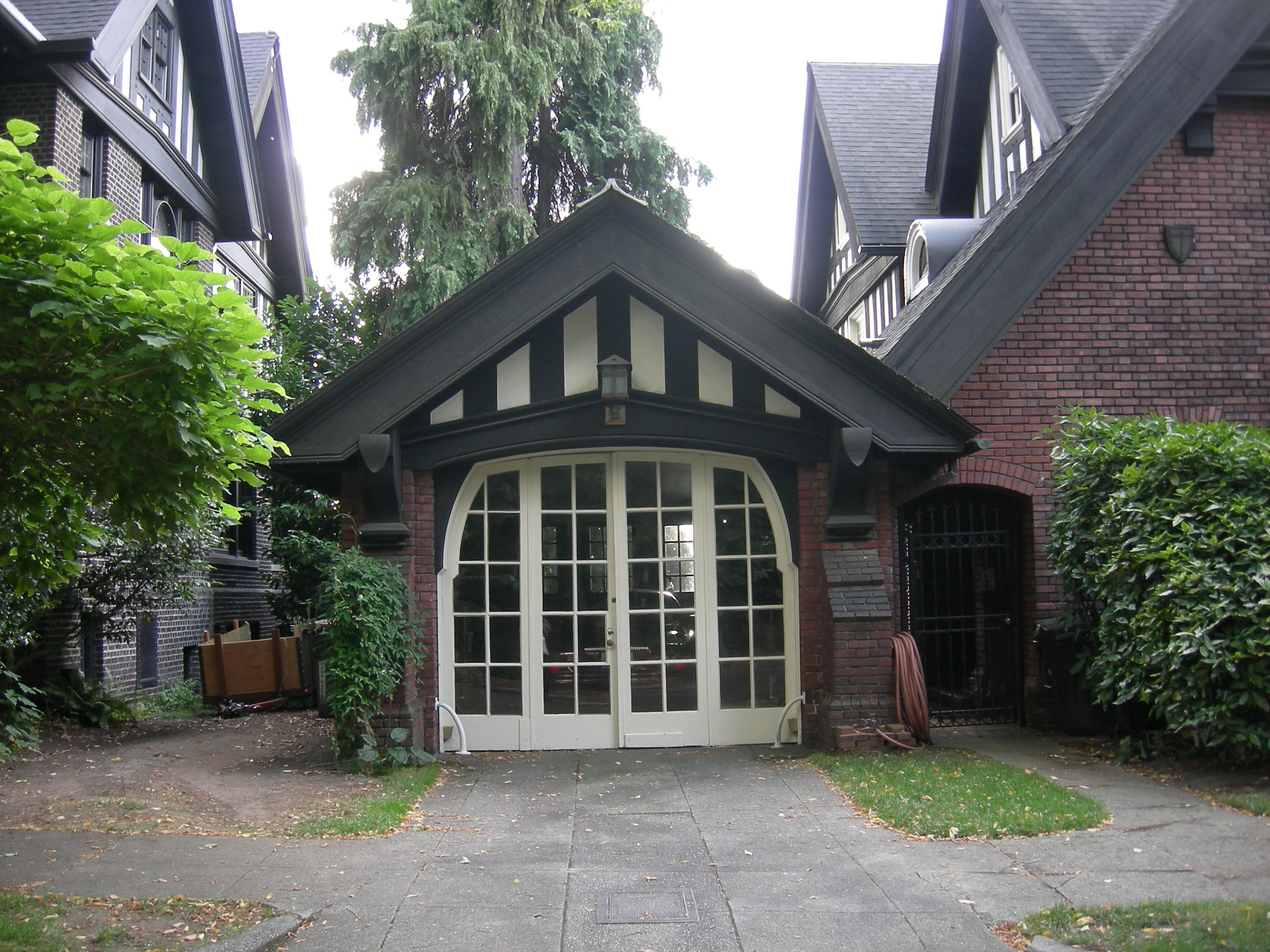

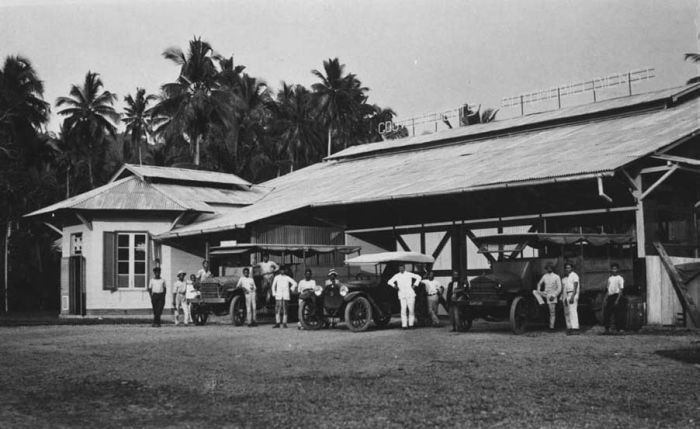
1919

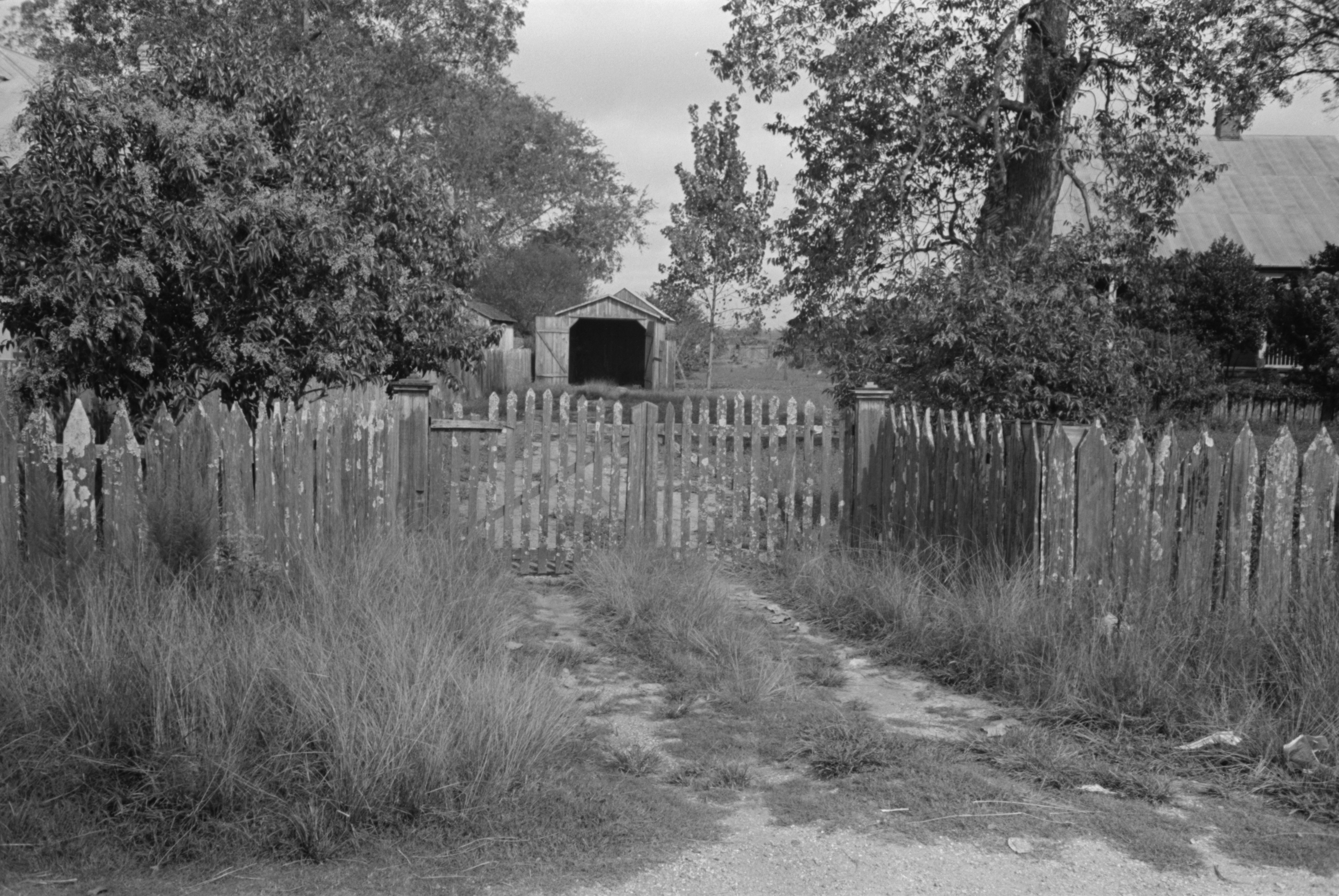
1938

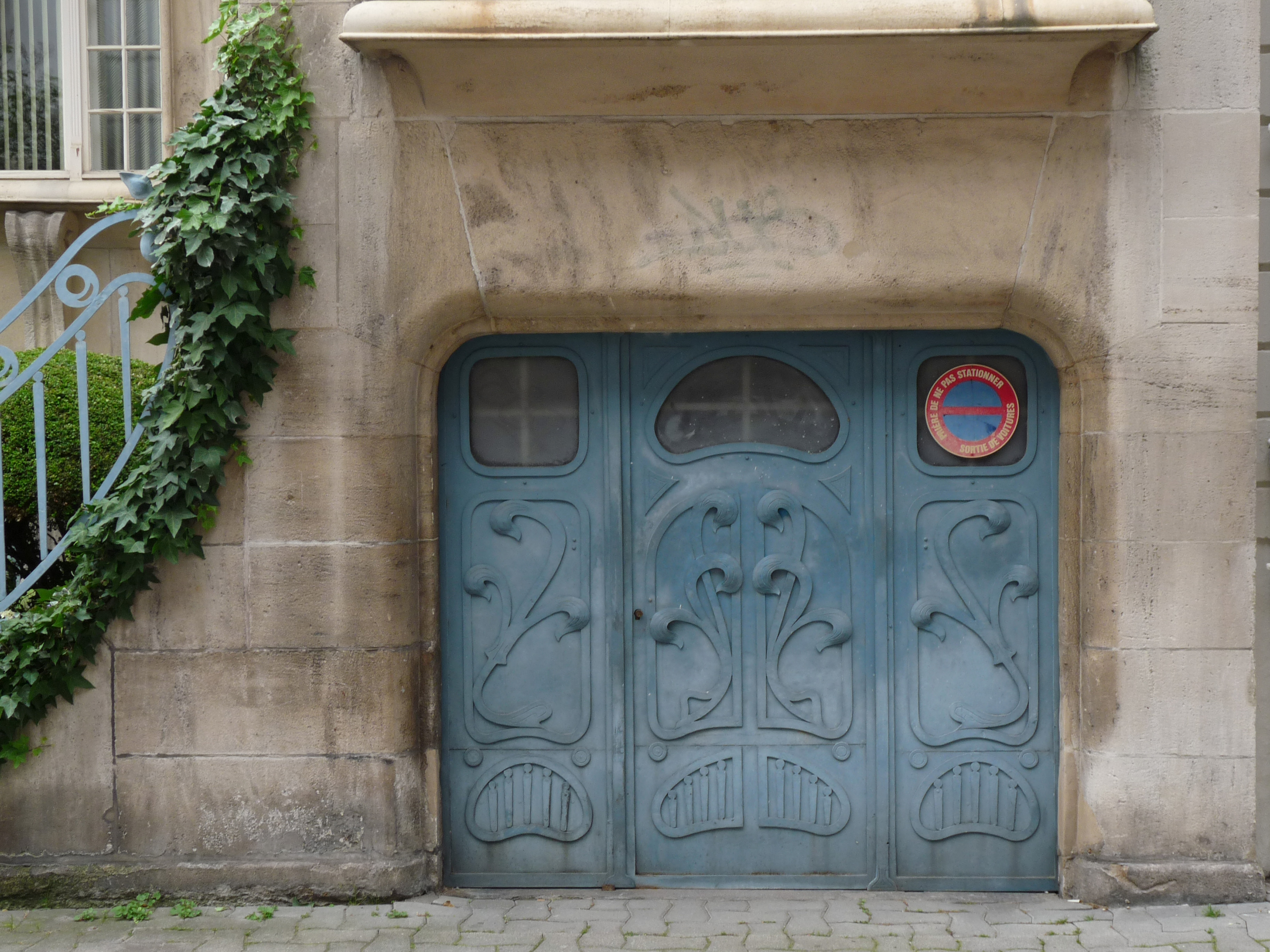
Garage of Hôtel Brion (1904)

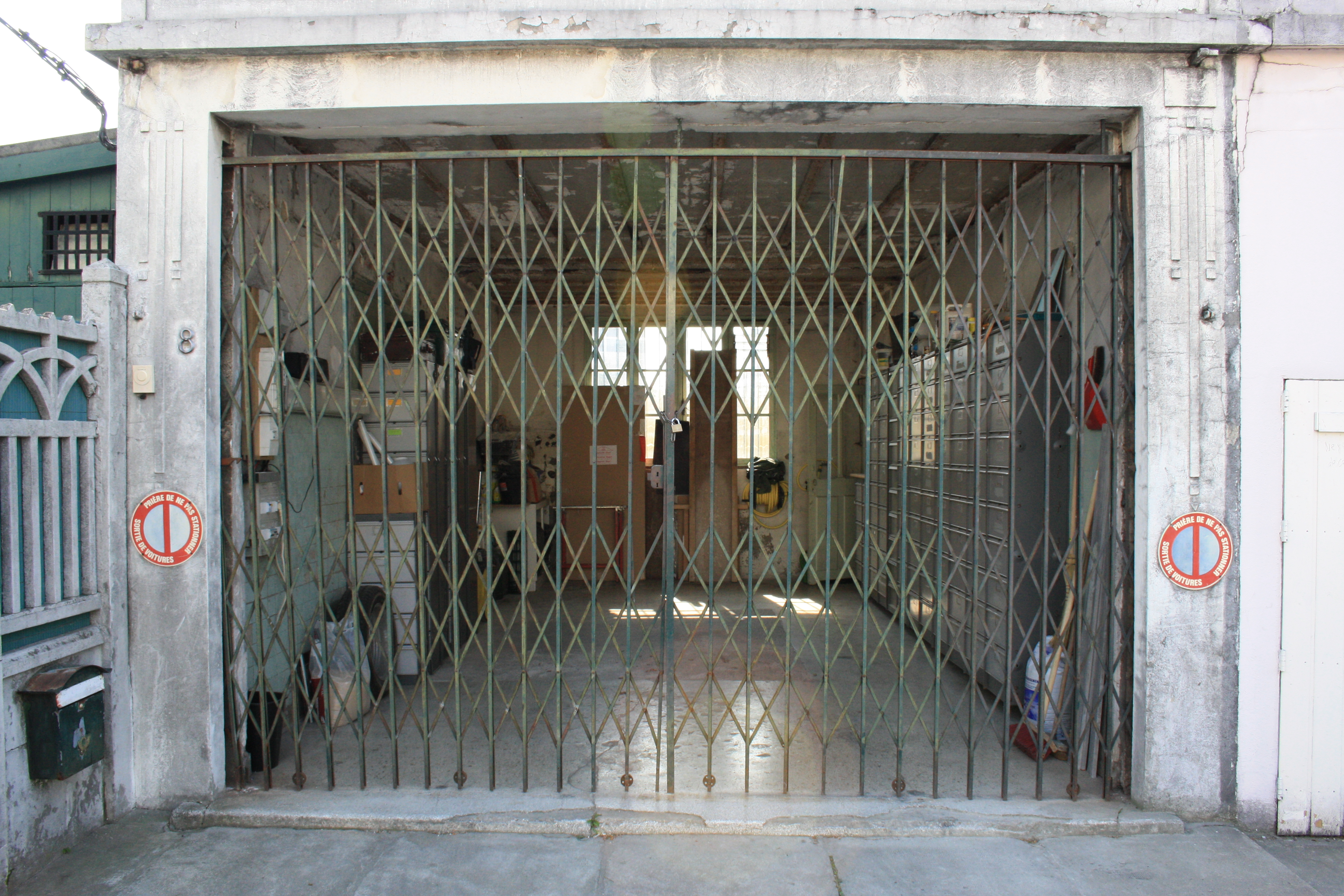

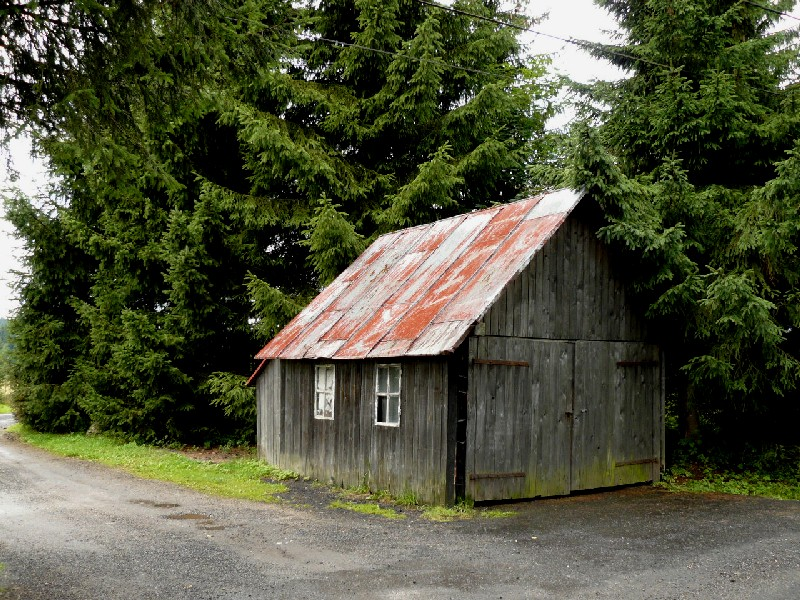

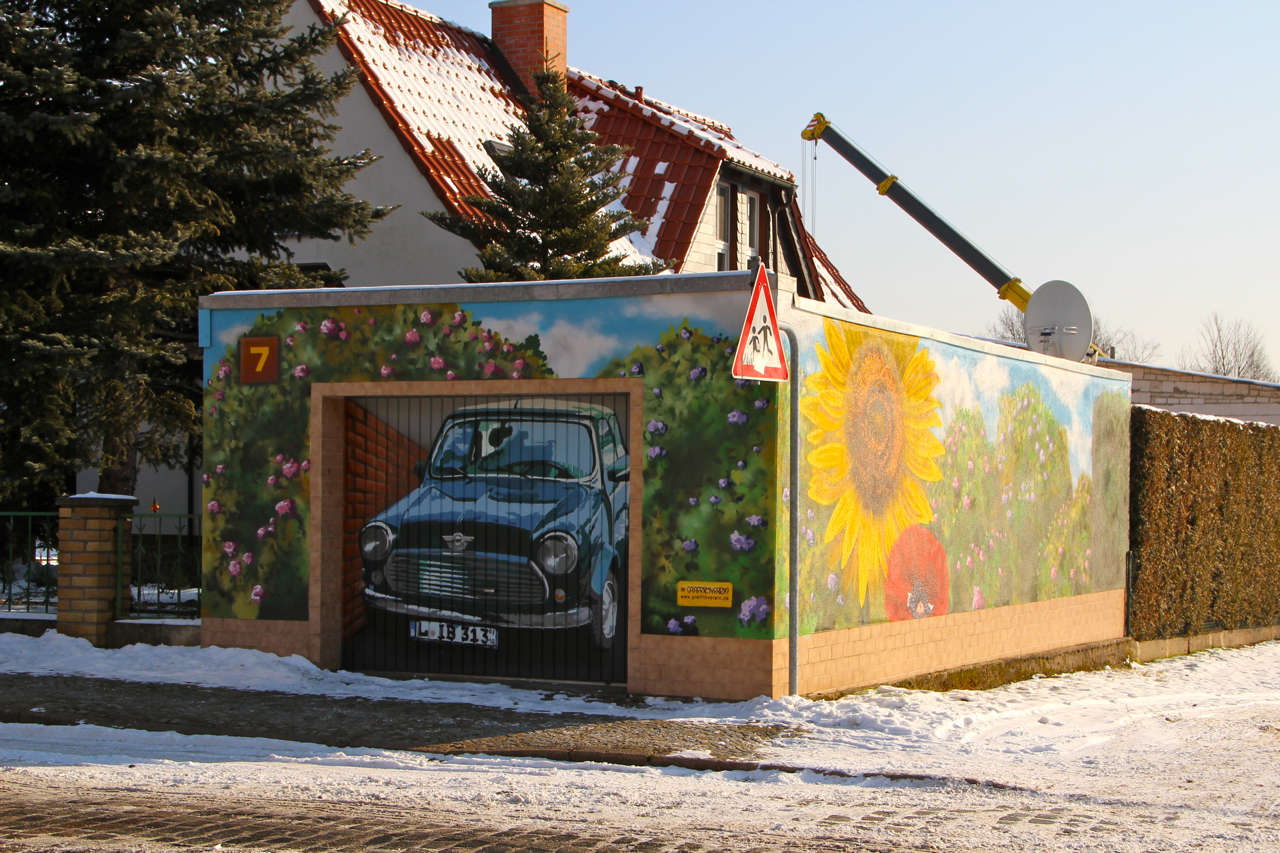

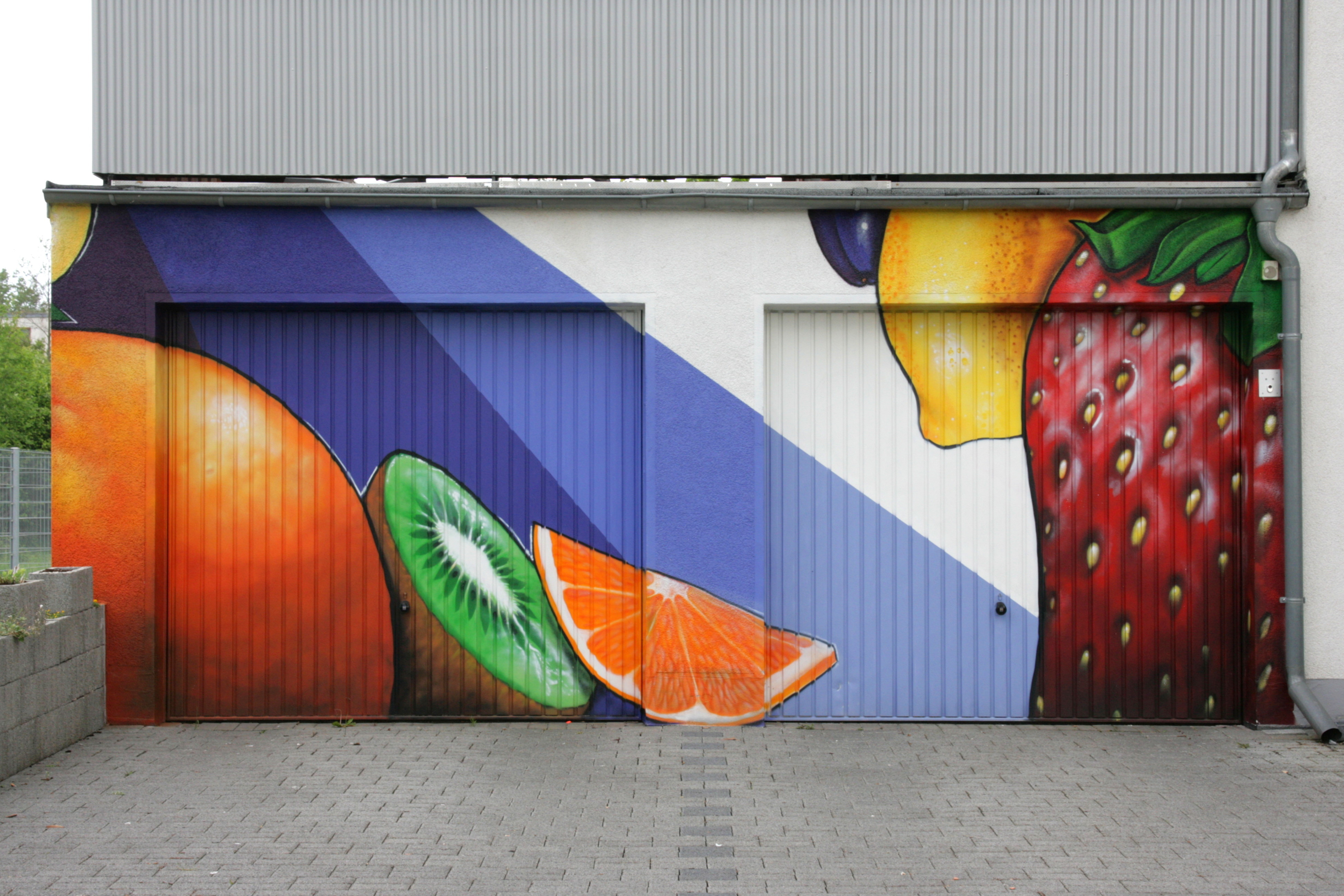

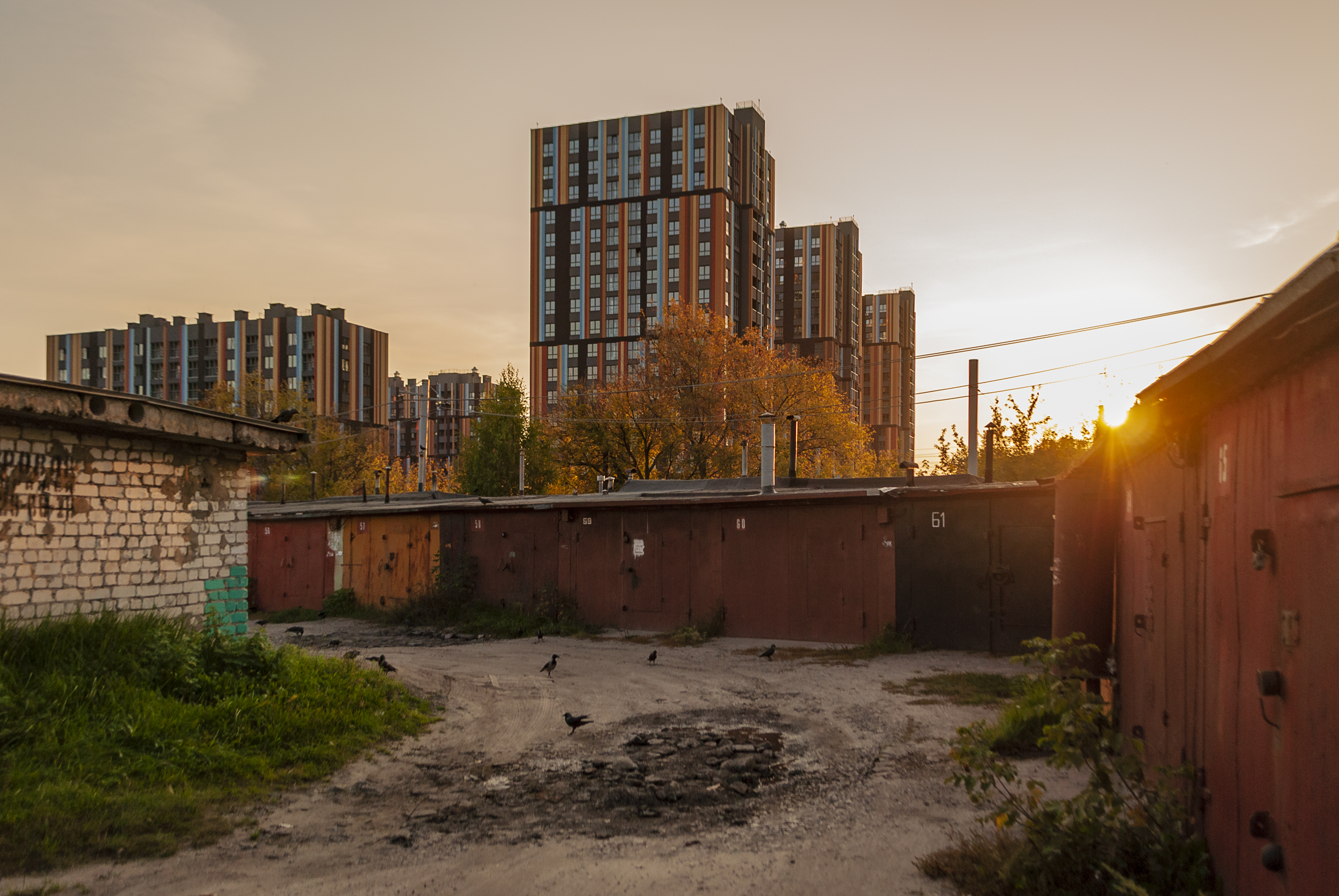
Garages in Nizhny Novgorod

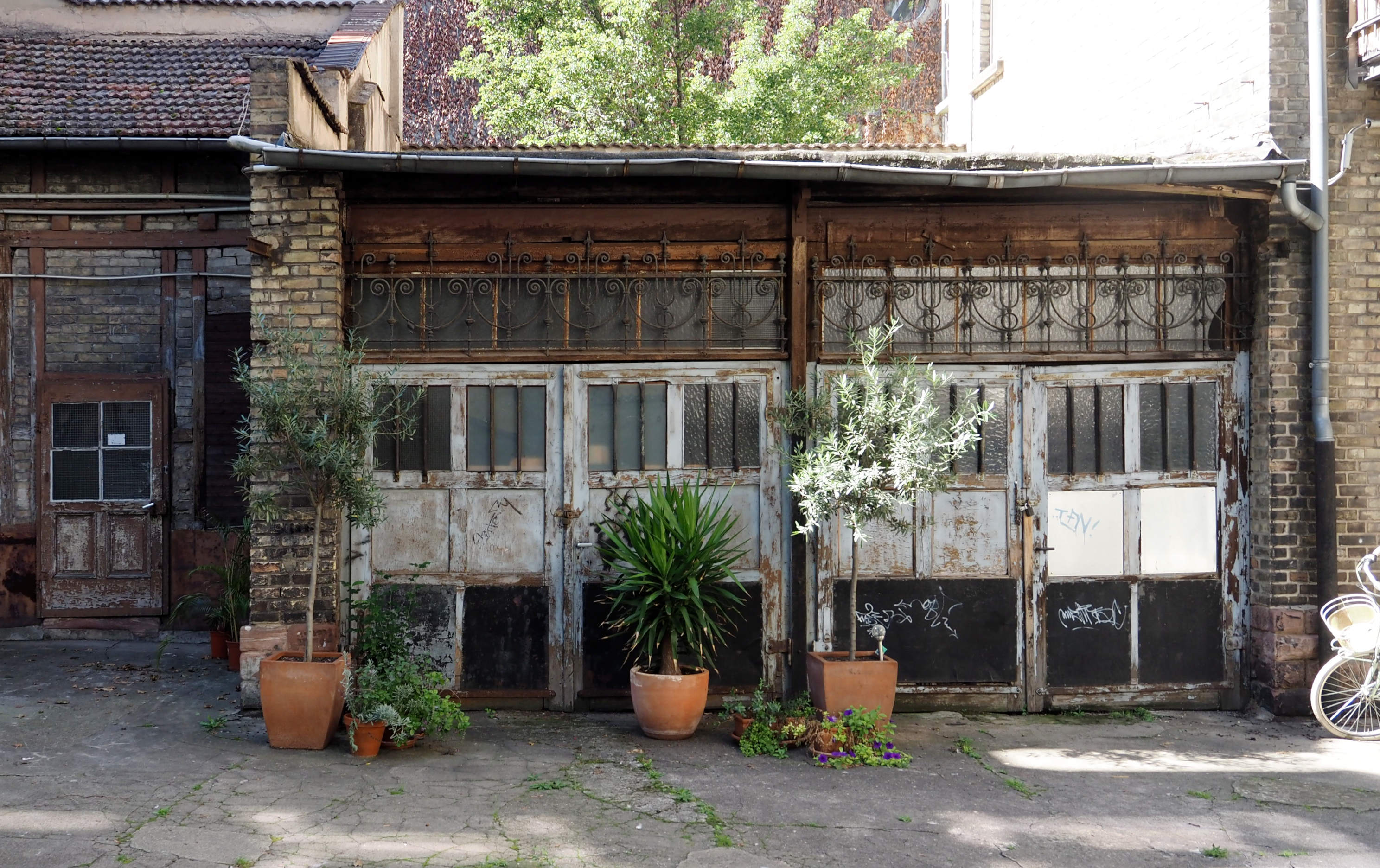
Old garages in Mannheim

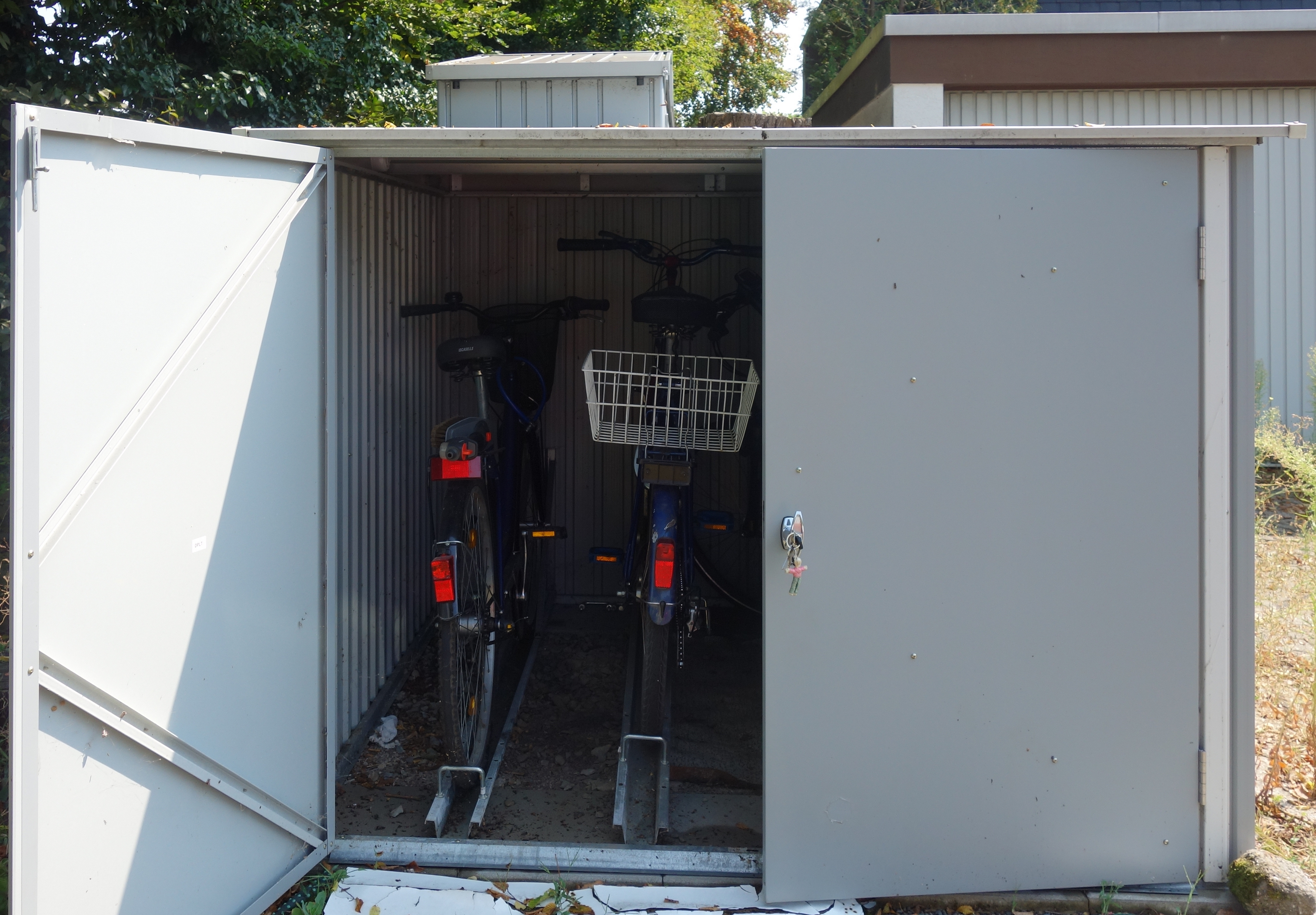
Bicycle garage in Bergisch Gladbach

== Carhouses ==
Garages in the United States and Canada used to store streetcars and buses are often referred to as carhouses or car barns. These storage facilities are either metal or brick structures used to store streetcars or buses away from the elements. In Britain they are referred to as bus depots or depots.

== See also ==
- Carport
- Carriage house
- Parking
- Proof-of-parking
