= Maryleen Schiltkamp =

Visual artist

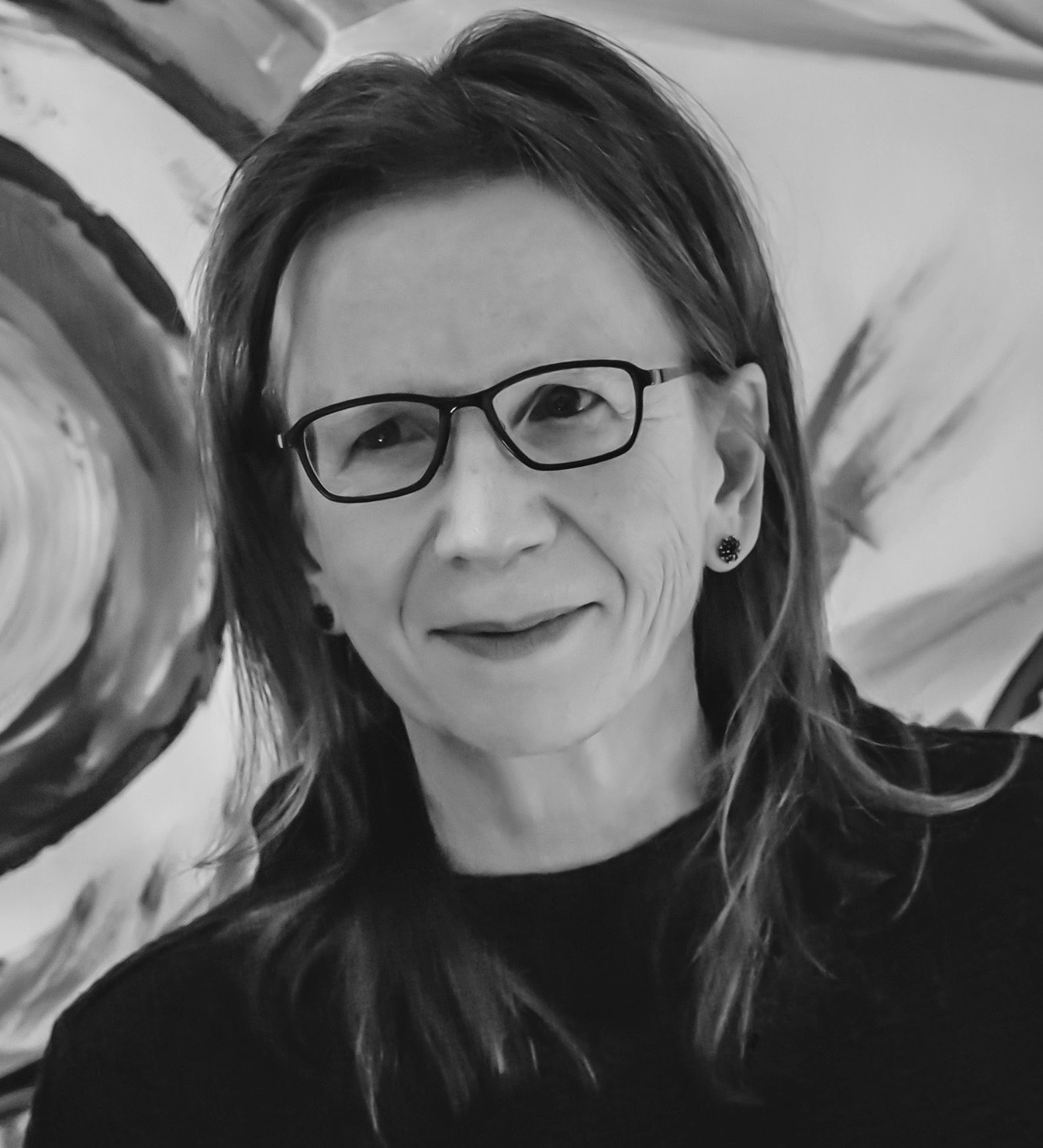
Maryleen Schiltkamp

Maryleen Schiltkamp (1959) is a visual artist who was born on the Caribbean island of Curaçao and also grew up there. She studied graphic design at the Rietveld Academie (1977–1978) and classical fine art, painting and sculpting at the Rijksakademie van Beeldende Kunsten (1978–1981) in Amsterdam, the Netherlands.

Besides in Amsterdam, Schiltkamp has lived and worked in New York City, Saint Petersburg and Prague.

== Development ==
The New York magazine Gallery & Studio once called her "one of our more historically aware contemporary artists, forging “connections between the classical and the modern, the figurative and the abstract”.

- She also sculpts. In 1982, she worked in the marble quarries of Carrara in Italy and on the Greek island of Tinos.
- She often paints with oil on canvas. Her 1993 exhibition at the Curaçaosch Museum, for example, exclusively featured oil paintings.
- After she became interested in Japanese art in 1996, she started working with paper, scrolls and folding screens.
- Since 2013, she has been cooperating with musicians in an art form called "MusicPainting", after Latvian pianist Reinis Zariņš reached out to her on Facebook "looking for someone who could paint the objective content of the music as it was being played".

== MusicPainting and other projects ==
Reinis Zariņš and Maryleen Schiltkamp met in 2013. In the following ten years, they performed in five projects, such as one featuring works by Bach, Ravel and Messiaen at the Cēsis Arts Festival (Latvia) in 2017 and Russian piano masterpieces at the 2018 winter festival at the Amsterdam Hermitage (which was renamed H'Art after ties to Russia were cut in 2023).

She has also worked with the Icelandic and French-Russian Duo Ingolfsson-Stoupel (consisting of violinist Judith Ingolfsson and pianist Vladimir Stoupel) as well as with Dutch pianist Tobias Borsboom. In 2018, the British Fitzwilliam String Quartet celebrated its 50th anniversary with a joint project of Schiltkamp and Dora Williams. Others she performs with include pianist Alexander Kraft van Ermel, grandson of composer Wim Statius Muller, for example in the project "Excursions!".

Schiltkamp's association with music is not new, however, as evidenced in the description of her oil painting "Le Sacre" (1991) in which a "Summerian myth from 2,000 B.C. is linked with Greek mythology and hedonistic vegetation-rites which dance their way up to the Rite of Spring symphony by 20th century composer Igor Stravinsky". She took piano lessons as a child.

Through the LiveART Foundation, which she launched in 2022, she commissioned the work "Atlantis and other utopias" by Austrian-born composer and pianist Marion von Tilzer, which will be performed by the Amstel Quartet on saxophones, Marion von Tilzer on piano as well as German drummer and percussionist Jacobus Thiele.

== Exhibitions ==
Schiltkamp has exhibited and performed in different countries such as France, England, the United States (for example in the Sylvia White Gallery, Los Angeles in 1995 and in Atelier International, New York in 2002), the Netherlands (for example at Studio 2000 Art Gallery, Amsterdam in 1993) and Japan (for example in the Bungei Shunju Gallery in Tokyo 1998 and 2003). Besides in Japan, her solo exhibition "Japonismes" was also on display at the Nippon Gallery in New York City in 2003.

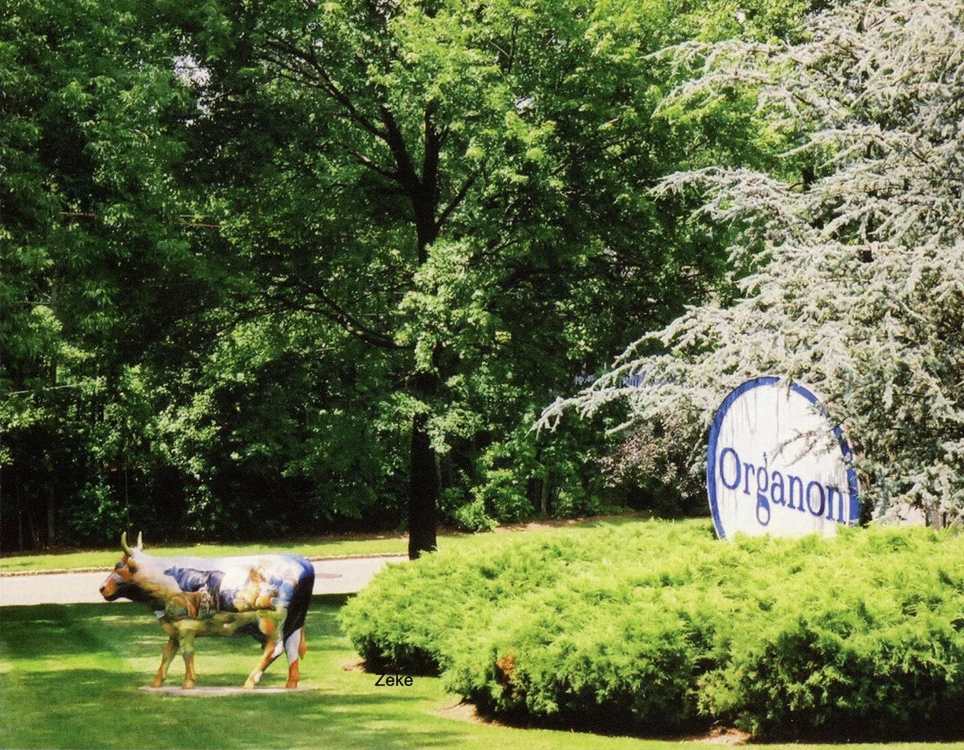
Maryleen Schiltkamp's contribution to Cow Parade for Organon in 2000

Her work is part of private collections in various countries. In 2000, she created the work "Holland on the Hoof" as part of Cow Parade for the headquarters of Organon, then based in West Orange, New Jersey. At the time, Organon was still part of AkzoNobel, which according to its website "has been supplying innovative paints and coatings" since 1792.

== Documentary ==
In 2017, the British documentary "The Art of the Symphony" – filmed in Prague, premiered in Paris, France and Prague, Czech Republic. Its director was Alan Mercer for DSCH Films. Mercer is also editor-in-chief of DSCH Journal (dedicated to the life and work of Dmitri Shostakovich) and founder of the DSCH Society, in which DSCH stands for the composer Dmitri Shostakovich. The documentary features Schiltkamp and her interpretations and renditions of Shostakovich's work. Screenings took place in various cities including The Hague and Amsterdam.
