= Mazel Tov (play) =

Yiddish-language play by Sholem Aleichem

Mazel-tov (Yiddish: מזל טוב, romanized: mazel tov; Russian title either «Мазлтов» or «Поздравляем», 1889), is a one-act Yiddish-language play by Sholem Aleichem. The play focuses on the relationship between servants, the cook Beyle, and the upstairs rich, the Landlord. One memorable servant song from the 1889 play "Bitter is the food That gets burnt, Bitter is it to work Beyond your strength", was later recycled and included into the 1949 and 1969 Jewish Theatre, Warsaw production of The Gold Diggers. The play was revived after the Russian Revolution in the repertoire of the Moscow Yiddish Chamber Theater (GOSET) in the 1920s. It was set as an opera Congratulations! («Поздравляем!», Op. 111) by Mieczysław Weinberg in 1975.
