= Judith Ingolfsson =

Icelandic musician

Judith Ingolfsson (born 13 May 1973 in Reykjavík, Iceland) is an internationally known violinist. She plays a violin made by Lorenzo Guadagnini in 1750.

Ingolfsson in 2010

== Early life ==
She began to play violin at age three, and debuted as a soloist in Germany already at age eight. She studied with Jascha Brodsky at the Curtis Institute of Music. She then studied at the Cleveland Institute of Music under David Cerone and Donald Weilerstein.

== Career ==
Judith Ingolfsson won first prize at the 1998 International Violin Competition of Indianapolis. She was also a prize winner at the 1998 Concert Artists Guild Competition and the 1997 International Violin Competition "Premio Paganini". In 1999 she was honored by National Public Radio as Debut Artist of the Year, and in 2001 received the Chamber Music America/WQXR Record Award for her debut CD with works by Bloch, Rorem, Bach, and Wieniawski.

In 2008 Judith became Professor of Violin at the Staatliche Hochschule für Musik und Darstellende Kunst Stuttgart . Since 2019, she has served as Professor of Violin at the Peabody Institute of the Johns Hopkins University.

Judith has performed with renowned orchestras across the globe, including the Philadelphia Orchestra, Indianapolis Symphony Orchestra, Saint Louis Symphony Orchestra, Washington's National Symphony Orchestra, Iceland Symphony Orchestra, Bohemian Chamber Philharmonic Orchestra, Royal Chamber Orchestra of Tokyo, and Budapest Philharmonic Orchestra. Her repertoire spans a wide range of musical styles and periods, showcasing her versatility as an artist.

In addition to her orchestral engagements, Judith has given recitals at prestigious venues worldwide, including the National Gallery of Art in Washington, D.C., Carnegie Hall, Wolf Trap, La Jolla Chamber Music Society, Reykjavík Arts Festival, and Tokyo Metropolitan Art Center. She is also an active chamber musician, collaborating with various ensembles such as the Avalon and Miami String Quartets, the Broyhill Chamber Ensemble, and the Chamber Music Society of Lincoln Center.

She performs regularly with Vladimir Stoupel as the Duo Ingolfsson-Stoupel. Judith and Stoupel are the artistic directors of the festival “Aigues-Vives en Musiques” in southern France, which they co-founded in 2009, as well as the festival “The Last Rose of Summer” in Berlin. This cooperation has included a project with visual artist Maryleen Schiltkamp. She is also a faculty member at the HIMA music festival in Reykjavík, Iceland.

== Discography ==
Year	Album title	Label	Notes
2023	Rebecca Clarke Sonatas for Violin, Viola and Piano	OEHMS Classics: OC 1731	with Vladimir Stoupel
2021	Sonatas for Violin and Piano	OEHMS Classics: OC 491	Rathaus, Tiessen, Arma with Vladimir Stoupel
2020	The Happiest Years	Genuin: 20711	Schnabel, Erdmann Sonatas for Solo Violin
2019	La Belle Époque	Genuin: 19674	Ysaÿe, Dubois, Franck with Vladimir Stoupel
2017	Poulenc, Ferroud & Ravel: Violin Sonatas	Accentus Music: ACC30436	with Vladimir Stoupel
2016	Joseph Holbrooke: Violin Concerto in F, Op. 59	CPO: 4100515	with Brandenburgisches Staatsorchester Frankfurt
2016	Concert-Centenaire, Vol. I	Accentus Music: ACC303711	Stephan, Magnard with Vladimir Stoupel
2016	Concert-Centenaire, Vol. II	Accentus Music: ACC303712	Vierne; with Rebecca Li, Stefan Fehlandt, Stephan Forck
2016	Concert-Centenaire, Vol. III	Accentus Music: ACC303713	Fauré with Vladimir Stoupel
2011	Stravinsky and Shostakovich: Works for Violin and Piano	Audite: AUD 92.576	with Vladimir Stoupel
2011	Eugène Ysaÿe: Six Sonatas for Violin Solo, Op. 27	Genuin: 11202	
2010	En Hommage: Simon Laks	EDA: 31	with Vladimir Stoupel and Leonid Gorokhov
2007	Tchaikovsky's Violin Concerto	BPO LIVE: B003LSTBP8	with Budapest Philharmonic Orchestra
2000	Judith Ingolfsson: Debut Recording	Catalpa Classics: 30101	with Ronald Sat
