= Mazel Tov (book) =

2021 book by J.S Margot

- Author: J.S Margot
- Original title: Mazel Tov: The Story of my Extraordinary Friendship with an Orthodox Jewish Family
- Publisher: Pushkin Press
- Publication date: January 7, 2021
- ISBN: 9781782275282
- Website: Mazel Tov: The Story of my Extraordinary Friendship with an Orthodox Jewish Family

Mazel Tov: The Story of my Extraordinary Friendship with an Orthodox Jewish Family is a memoir by journalist and literary translator J.S. Margot, translated into English by Jane Hedley-Prôle. Margot, a Belgian atheist from a Catholic background, recounts her experience spending time with a modern Orthodox Jewish family, the pseudonymous Schneiders, and their cultural eccentricities. This memoir is primarily about the author tutoring the Schneider children, especially two of the four children, from their childhood to their adulthood, and the role of Judaism in it.

== Content ==
The book starts by introducing the author, a 20-year-old university student who was looking for a part-time job to support herself through school. She lands a job as an after-school tutor for the children of Orthodox Jewish family in Antwerp, the Schneiders. When Margot ventures to meet with the parents of her children, she is confronted with the differences on the conduct and lifestyle of the family she meets. She could not fathom why the children's father, Mr. Schneider, would express reticence in shaking her hand as a form of greeting. She found Mrs. Schneider immaculately dressed and well-endowed, but somewhat unsettling to interact with.

Mrs. Schneider initially did not hire her as she learned that Margot's boyfriend was a refugee from Iran and came from an Islamic background. However, as all her hires ended up quitting their jobs at the Schneider home, Margot ended up at the Schneider home as the children's tutor.

As Margot begins to tutor the kids, it is quickly revealed that she spent the most time with their youngest son, Jakov, and the oldest daughter, Elzira, with whom she develops close bonds that extend till their adulthood. Jakov and Margot often engage in heated conversations about the insular nature of the Jews, the Jewish culture, and secular lifestyles, which he regards as "treyf". Margot find Jakov's behavior to be haughty, holier-than-thou and his classification of her as a "Goyte" tiresome.

Elzira is diagnosed with dyspraxia, which often causes her body to make involuntary movements. Margot helps Elzira overcome her fear of appearing clumsy and eventually acquire control of her dyspraxia.

In numerous conversations with the Schneider family throughout her time tutoring, she comes to know many facets of the orthodox Jewish life. Their dietary habits such as maintaining separate dishwashers and utensils for meat and dairy products, their Shabbat customs such as prohibition on work, study, travel, making music, usage of electronic appliances, and their work-arounds for these prohibitions, for example, to travel within buildings of multiple stories, the Jews often programmed their elevators to keep functioning throughout Shabbat without manual assistance, stopping at every floor of the building which would allow them to get their desired floor without violating their rule that prohibits them from operating an electronic device, however, an alternative for this is to have a "Goy" perform the job of pressing elevator buttons on their behalf.

Occasionally, Margot and the Schneiders have conversational exchanges about the Middle Eastern political climate. On one such occasion Mr. Schneider spots her with a left leaning newspaper in her pocket which leads to Mr. Schneider expressing his thoughts on the Israel-Palestine conflict when the author suggested that he speak out on behalf of all Jewish people when it concerned the growing antisemitic climate.

What, to your left-wing friends?... But they've no idea how dangerous their one-sided information will be in the long term. Their biased reporting is creating a climate—I've seen it happen over the past thirty years. I'm not saying that everyone has to be pro-Israel. But I would like is for people not to present the Arab world as saintly.

While the central theme of the story revolves around the author navigating and learning more about the modern Orthodox Jewish manner of life, the author also shares snippets from her personal life throughout the book. For a sizeable part of the book, Margot is in a long-term cohabiting romantic relationship with her boyfriend and Iranian refugee Nima. Nima, initially, does not like that Margot spends her time with a Jewish family, as he corresponds the Schneiders to Jewish people whom he equates to being political rivals; however, he is eventually invited to spend a Shabbat with the Schneiders, which leads to a cordial relationship between the two of them. Ultimately, Margot and Nima part ways as they both perceive the relationship to have outlived its spirit, and Margot ends up with a Dutch man named Martinus, whom the Schneiders meet.

In the later chapters of the book, Margot covers where the Schneiders are in their lives presently. Both Elzira and Jakov have married and live in New York, and between the two of them, they have a total of 9 children. Mr. and Mrs. Schneider have moved to New York to be closer to their children. Sam, their eldest son, is a doctor in the Netherlands, and Sara, the youngest daughter, remains her cheerful self.

The book closes by Margot describing her efforts to author the memoir, she is put in touch with two Jewish matchmakers by Mrs. Schneider to help write about the ways of marriage in the Jewish community both of whom rudely decline, in the last few chapters of the book, Margot carries along writing materials with her to document her time with the Schneiders in the quest to write a book.

== Reception ==
The Guardian praised the novel's "empathetic outsider's perspective", which they say "never really gets to the heart of what she nicely describes as 'the millefeuille of Jewish culture'" but does highlight "humanity’s infinite variety". The Herald described it as "a heartwarming true-life account of wary people overcoming their preconceptions which doesn’t gloss over its author’s flaws."
