= Vladimir Stoupel =

- Stoupel in 2010

Background information
- Born: 10 May 1962 (age 64)
- Genre: Classical music
- Occupation: Pianist
- Instrument: Piano
- Label: Accentus Music
- Website: vladimir-stoupel.com

Vladimir Stoupel (born 10 May 1962) is a Russian-born French pianist and conductor.

He began studying the piano at age of three with his mother, Rimma Bobritskaia. He made his debut at the age of twelve, playing Tchaikovsky's First Piano Concerto in the Great Hall of the Moscow Conservatory. He later studied piano with Yevgeny Malinin and conducting with Gennady Rozhdestvensky at the Moscow Conservatory, and was a pupil of the Russian pianist Lazar Berman for almost five years.

Stoupel was a top prizewinner at the Geneva International Music Competition in 1986 and has performed as soloist with various major orchestras. His discography includes the complete works for piano solo of Arnold Schoenberg and of Alexander Scriabin (at the Piano en Valois Festival he played the entire cycle of Scriabin's sonatas in a single performance from memory). His recording of the complete works for viola and piano by Henri Vieuxtemps with violist Thomas Selditz was awarded the "Preis der deutschen Schallplattenkritik" in 2003.

As a chamber musician, he participates in the New York Philharmonic’s annual chamber music series at Merkin and Avery Fischer Halls. He performs regularly with violinists Judith Ingolfsson and Mark Peskanov, with the cellist Peter Bruns and with the Robert Schumann String Quartet. Singers with whom he has collaborated include Wolfgang Brendel, Elena Zaremba and Evgeny Nesterenko. As part of his cooperation with the Icelandic violinist Judith Ingolfsson, he has worked with visual artist Maryleen Schiltkamp.

In 2012, he conducted the premiere outside Russia of Weinberg's opera Pozdravlyayem! in a German translation. In 2022, he was awarded a French Order "Chevalier des Arts et des Lettres".

The Washington Post has talked about his “protean range of expression” and Der Tagesspiegel in Berlin called his performance as “enthralling and atmospherically dense.” “Unforgettable!” commented the Frankfurter Algemeine Zeitung after a solo concert.

He currently lives in Berlin, Germany, where he forms a duo with violinist Judith Ingolfsson. Together with Ingolfsson, he serves as artistic director of the festival “Aigues-Vives en Musiques” in southern France, which they founded in 2009, as well as the festival “The Last Rose of Summer” in Berlin.
