= Curaçao Museum =

Art and cultural history museum in Curaçao

- Curaçaosch Museum; Museo di Kòrsou
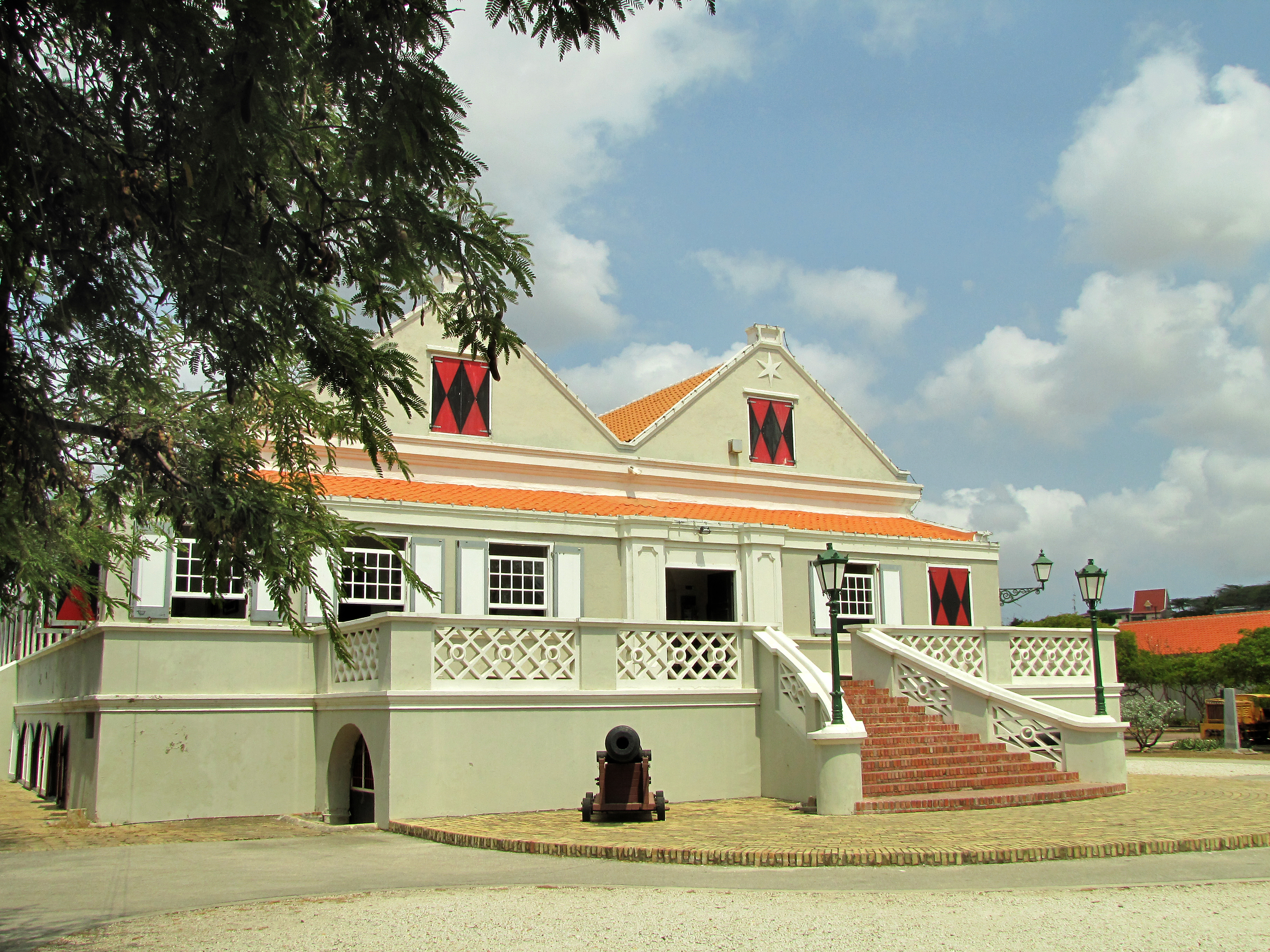

- Location within Curaçao
- Established: 7 March 1948
- Location: Van Leeuwenhoekstraat, Otrobanda, Willemstad, Curaçao
- Coordinates: 12.11188°N 68.94730°W
- Website: hetcuracaosch.museum

The Curaçao Museum (Dutch: Curaçaosch Museum, Papiamentu: Museo di Kòrsou) is an art and cultural history museum in Curaçao. The museum opened on 7 March 1948, and is the oldest museum in Curaçao which still exists. The museum is located in the former military hospital.

== History ==
In 1946, the Curaçao Museum Foundation was established by Chris Engels to create a museum about the art and cultural history of the Netherlands Antilles which was partially funded by the government and by the Curaçaoan community who raised ƒ 80,000 for the project. The museum was opened in 1948 in the former military quarantine hospital Mundo Nobo. The buildings date from 1853 and have been redesigned between 1951 and 1953 to form one complex.

The museum contains a large collection of historical objects such as furniture, artifacts, and a traditional Curaçaoan kitchen. The objects date from the 18th until the early 20th century. There is a large collection of paintings, sculptures and drawings. The basement contains an exhibition of the Amerindian history of Curaçao.

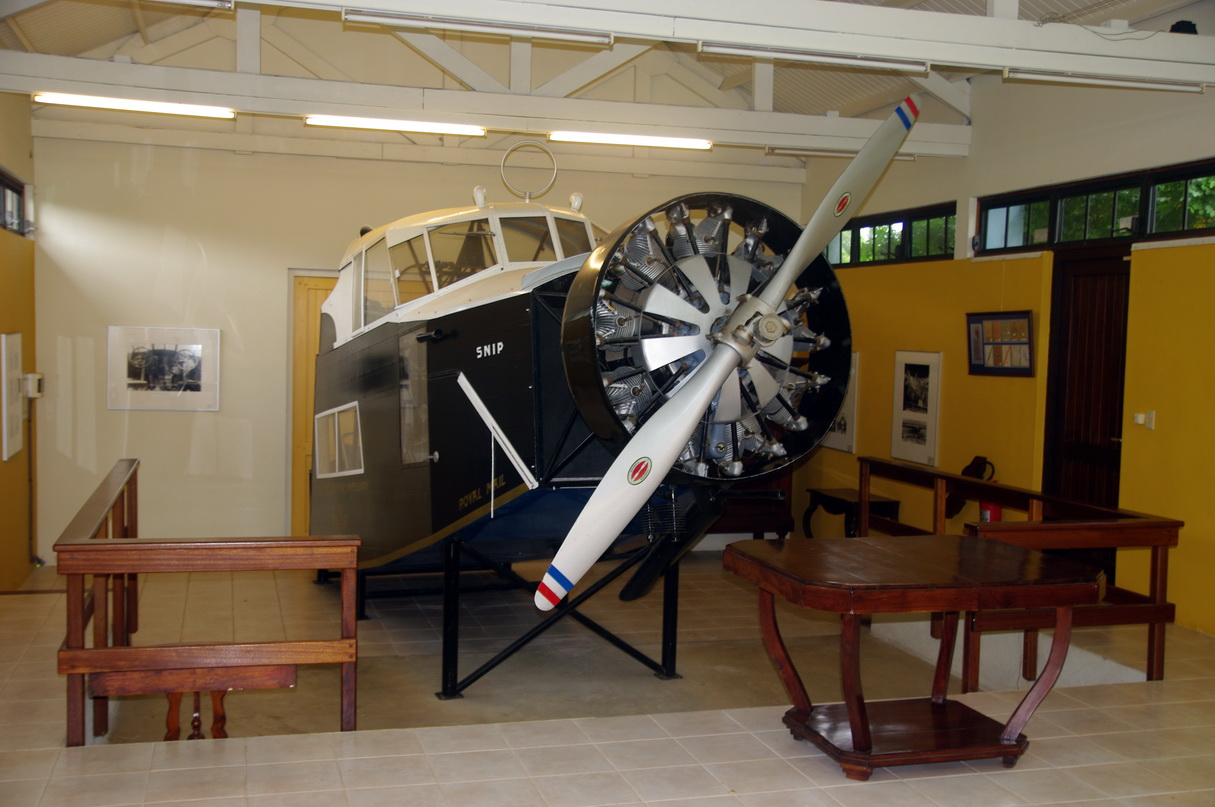
The Snip in the Curaçao museum

The museum also contains the locomotive of the first mining railway, and the cockpit of the Snip, the first airplane to land in Curaçao from the Netherlands.

There is a botanical garden on the grounds with trees and plants which have become rare on Curaçao. The sculpture garden contains statues of the freedom fighters Luis Brion and Manuel Piar.

The Curaçao Museum regularly organises exhibitions of local and international artists. In 1954, it organised the first exhibition of Vincent van Gogh in the Caribbean. Artist who have exhibited in the Curaçao Museum include Hendrik Chabot, Edgar Fernhout, Wim Schuhmacher, Maryleen Schiltkamp, Jan Sluyters, and Carel Willink. Eksibishon di nos Arte (Exhibition of our Art) is an exhibition which is organised every five years to showcase the local art scene.

== Building ==
The museum is located in the former military hospital Mundo Novo (new world). The government had purchased the plantation Plantersrust, and in 1892, constructed a military hospital on top of the hill. The building consists of separate units connected by galleries. It has been declared a monument. During World War II, the building had been used as an internment camp for Jewish women and children who had been put ashore.

== See also ==
- List of carillons

== Bibliography ==
- Römer, René A. (1977). Cultureel mozaïek van de Nederlandse Antillen (in Dutch). Zutphen: Walburg Pers. ISBN 9060110838.
