= Tula (Curaçao) =

Leader of the Curaçao Slave Revolt of 1795

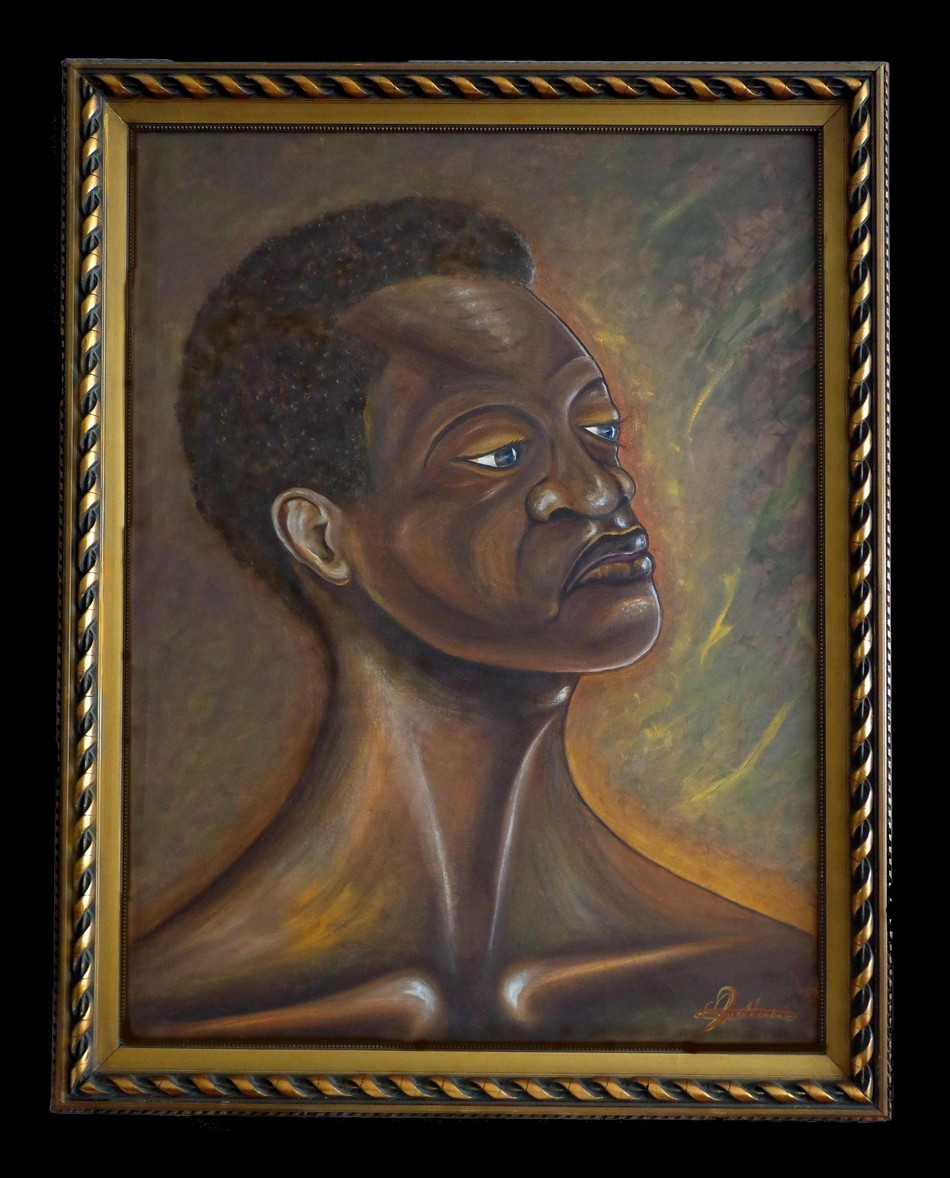
- Modern artist impression of Tula by Edsel Selberie
- Died: 3 October 1795; Curaçao, Dutch West Indies
- Cause of death: Execution by torture
- Monuments: Tula Monument on the south coast of Curaçao
- Known for: Leading the Curaçao Slave Revolt of 1795

Tula (died 3 October 1795), also known as Tula Rigaud, was an African man enslaved on the island of Curaçao, in the Dutch West Indies, who liberated himself and led the Curaçao Slave Revolt of 1795. The revolt, which began on 17 August 1795, lasted for more than a month. He was executed on 3 October 1795. He is revered on Curaçao today as a fighter for human rights and independence.

The Tula Museum is a museum dedicated to Tula and his revolt, and is located in the Knip Plantation where the revolt started.

The film Tula: The Revolt (2013) is based on Tula's life story.

== The revolt and reporting on Tula ==
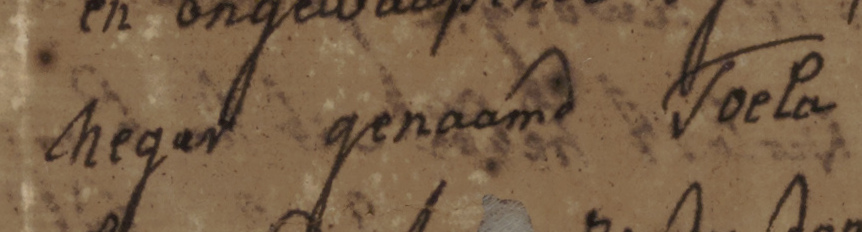
Manuscript text fragment "neger genaamd Toela" (negro called Toela) from the report by catholic priest Jacobus Schinck of 7 September 1795.

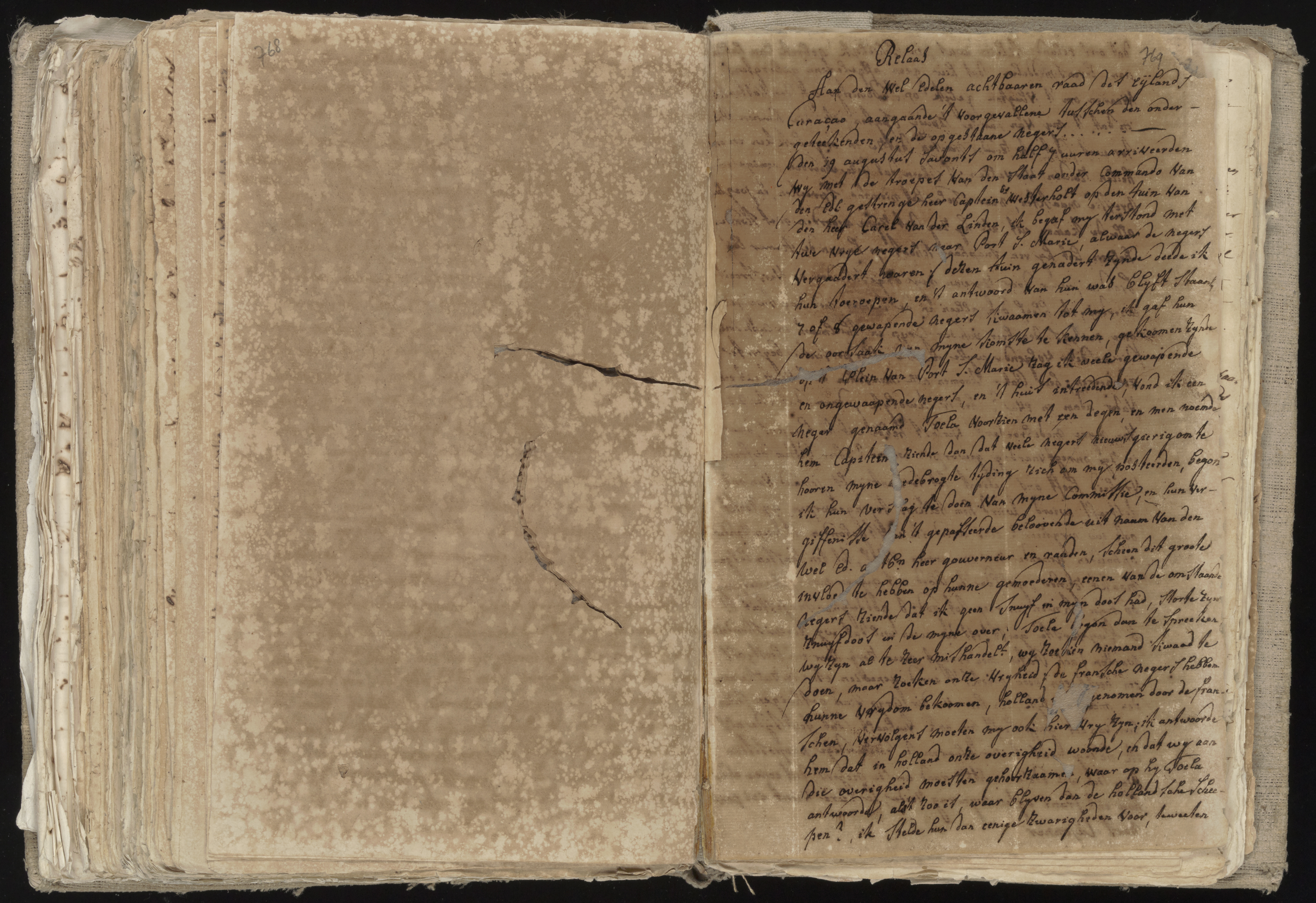
The encounter with Tula reported by Father Jacobus Schink on 7 September 1795 (Nationaal Archief, The Hague.

On August 17, 1795, Tula refused to go to work, and along with about forty to fifty fellow slaves, he went to his owner Caspar Lodewijk Van Uytrecht to plead for their freedom, to which they believed they were entitled. Out of force majeure, Van Uytrecht referred him to the governor in Willemstad to tell his story to him; the group under Tula's leadership left.

The group moved across the island past various plantations, such as Lagún, Santa Cruz, Porto Marie, San Nicolas, Santa Martha and San Juan, with more and more slaves joining them. They freed slaves who were imprisoned, so the group under Tula's leadership expanded to two thousand slaves.

The Colonial Council tried to counter the rebellion and return the slaves to their plantations by negotiating. Several envoys were sent to speak with Tula as leader of the rebellion and reported on this.

These sources make up most of what is known about Tula. One of the envoys was Franciscan Father Jacobus Schinck. These documents are at the National Archives of the Netherlands including the record of the capture, interrogation and torture and sentencing (execution).

== See also ==
- Maria (rebel leader)
