= 1716 =

1716 in various calendars
- Gregorian calendar: 1716; MDCCXVI
- Ab urbe condita: 2469
- Armenian calendar: 1165; ԹՎ ՌՃԿԵ
- Assyrian calendar: 6466
- Balinese saka calendar: 1637–1638
- Bengali calendar: 1122–1123
- Berber calendar: 2666
- British Regnal year: 2 Geo. 1 – 3 Geo. 1
- Buddhist calendar: 2260
- Burmese calendar: 1078
- Byzantine calendar: 7224–7225
- Chinese calendar: 乙未年 (Wood Goat); 4413 or 4206 — to — 丙申年 (Fire Monkey); 4414 or 4207
- Coptic calendar: 1432–1433
- Discordian calendar: 2882
- Ethiopian calendar: 1708–1709
- Hebrew calendar: 5476–5477
- Hindu calendars
- Vikram Samvat: 1772–1773
- Shaka Samvat: 1637–1638
- Kali Yuga: 4816–4817
- Holocene calendar: 11716
- Igbo calendar: 716–717
- Iranian calendar: 1094–1095
- Islamic calendar: 1128–1129
- Japanese calendar: Shōtoku 6 / Kyōhō 1 (享保元年)
- Javanese calendar: 1639–1640
- Julian calendar: Gregorian minus 11 days
- Korean calendar: 4049
- Minguo calendar: 196 before ROC 民前196年
- Nanakshahi calendar: 248
- Thai solar calendar: 2258–2259
- Tibetan calendar: ཤིང་མོ་ལུག་ལོ་ (female Wood-Sheep); 1842 or 1461 or 689 — to — མེ་ཕོ་སྤྲེ་ལོ་ (male Fire-Monkey); 1843 or 1462 or 690

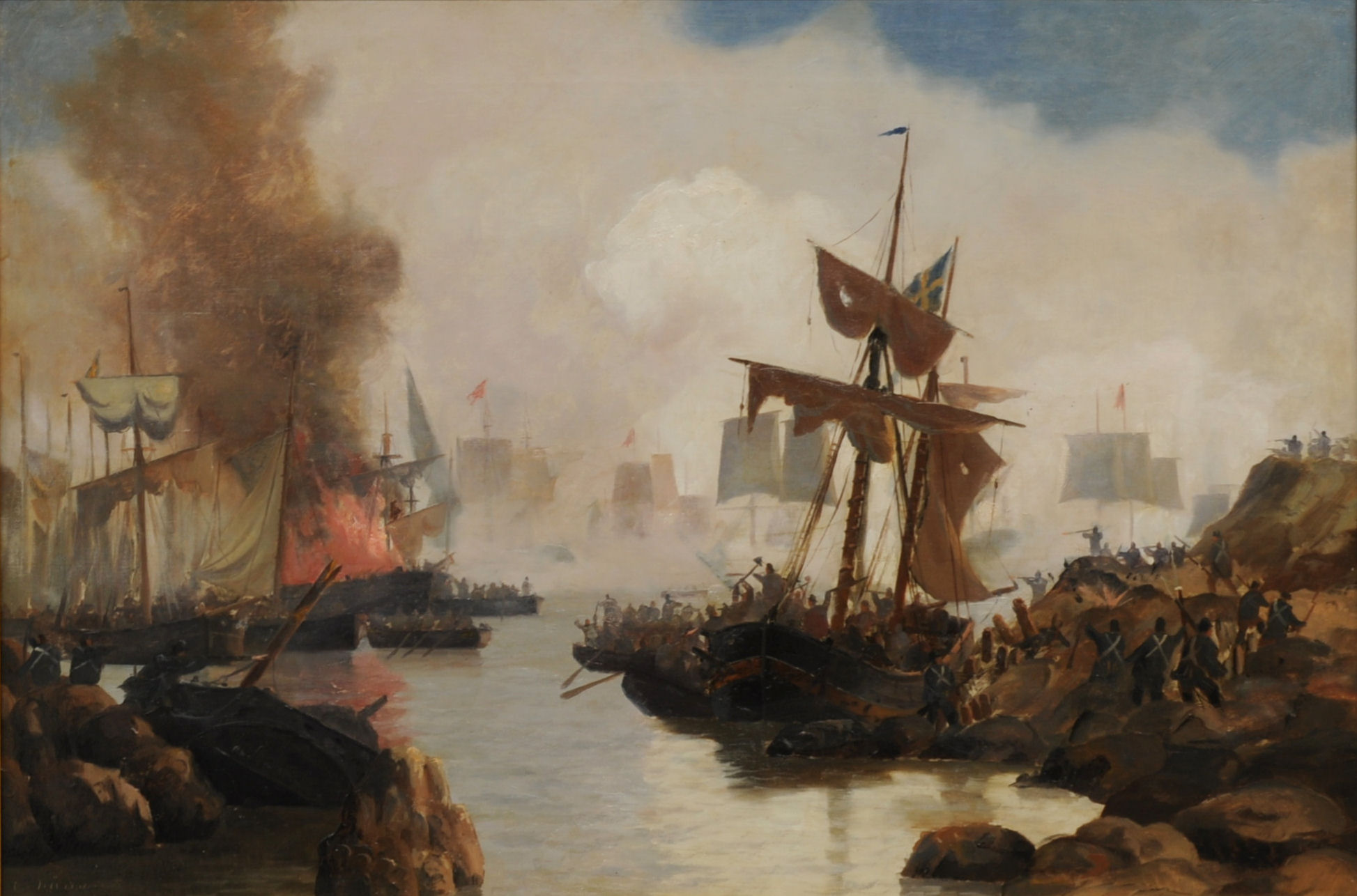
July 8: The Swedish Navy loses to Danish and Norwegian fleet at the Battle of Dynekilen.

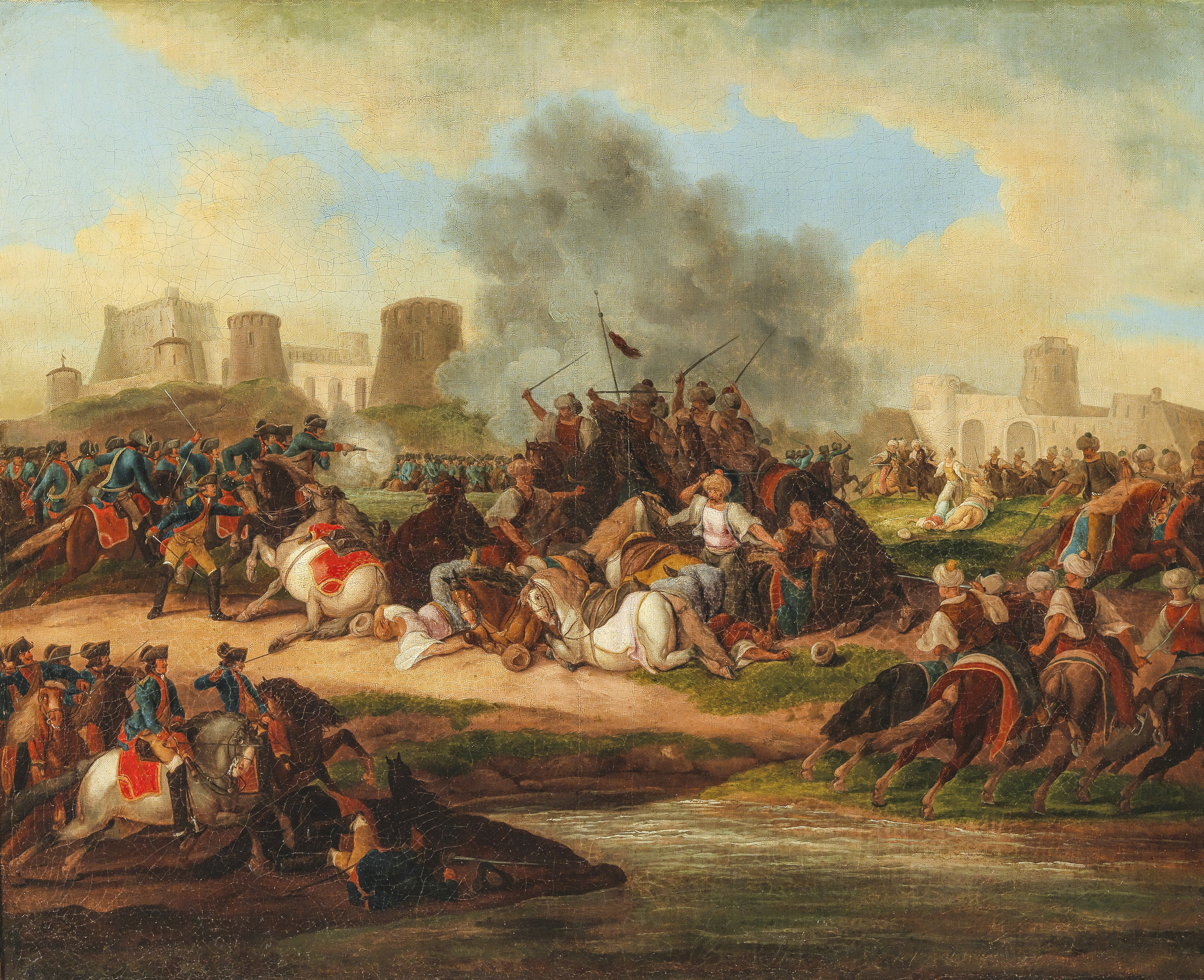
August 8: Austrian troops defeat larger Ottoman force in Battle of Petrovaradin.

1716 (MDCCXVI) was a leap year starting on Wednesday of the Gregorian calendar and a leap year starting on Sunday of the Julian calendar, the 1716th year of the Common Era (CE) and Anno Domini (AD) designations, the 716th year of the 2nd millennium, the 16th year of the 18th century, and the 7th year of the 1710s decade. As of the start of 1716, the Gregorian calendar was 11 days ahead of the Julian calendar, which remained in localized use until 1923.

== Events ==
=== January–March ===
- January 16 – The application of the Nueva Planta decrees to Catalonia make it subject to the laws of the Crown of Castile, and abolishes the Principality of Catalonia as a political entity, concluding the unification of Spain under Philip V.
- January 27 – The Tugaloo massacre changes the course of the Yamasee War, allying the Cherokee nation with the British province of South Carolina against the Creek Indian nation.
- January 28 – The town of Crieff, Scotland, is burned to the ground by Jacobites returning from the Battle of Sheriffmuir.
- February 3 – The 1716 Algiers earthquake sequence begins with a M_{w} 7.0 mainshock that causes severe damage and kills 20,000 in Algeria.
- February 10 – James Edward Stuart flees from Scotland to France with a handful of supporters, following the failure of the Jacobite rising of 1715.
- February 24 – Jacobite leaders James Radclyffe, 3rd Earl of Derwentwater and William Gordon, 6th Viscount of Kenmure are executed in London.
- March 6 – At night, an aurora borealis is seen throughout Europe, from Ireland to Italy.
- March 8 – King Charles XII of Sweden leads an invasion of Norway, crossing the border at Basmo, near the modern-day town of Marker.
- March 10 – Simon Fraser, a former Scottish rebel who had helped end the Siege of Inverness during the first Jacobite rising, is given a pardon by King George I of Great Britain.
- March 18 – Italian Jesuit missionary Ippolito Desideri arrives in Lhasa to become one of the first Europeans to attempt to bring Christianity to Buddhist Tibet.
- March 23 – Jeremias III becomes the new Ecumenical Patriarch of Constantinople, leader of the Eastern Orthodox Christian Church.

=== April–June ===
- April 13 – Austria, ruled by King Charles VI, renews its alliance with the Republic of Venice, leading the Ottoman Empire, ruled by Ahmed III, to declare war.
- May 20 – John Law founds the Banque Générale Privée in Paris.
- May 26 – Two regular companies of field artillery, each 100 men strong, are raised at Woolwich, by Royal Warrant of King George I of Great Britain.
- May 28 – John Churchill, 1st Duke of Marlborough, suffers a paralytic stroke.
- June 9 – In India, 600 imprisoned members of the failed Sikh Khalsa rebellion against the Mughal Empire are executed on orders of the Emperor Farrukhsiyar. Banda Singh Bahadur, leader of the rebellion, is brutally tortured and mutilated before being killed.
- June 19 – The new Tokugawa Shogun of Japan, Tokugawa Yoshimune, assumes control of the monarchy's military after the illness and death of the six-year-old Ietsugu, last of the male descendants of Tokugawa Ieyasu. Yoshimune's ascendancy begins Year 1 of the Kyōhō Era, which continues until Year 21 in 1736.
- June 25 – With the Holy Roman Empire having been ceded the "Southern Netherlands" (modern Belgium) from Spain, Prince Eugene of Savoy arrives in Brussels as the first Governor-General of the Austrian Netherlands. Eugene soon returns home and leaves administration of the area to a dictatorial Hercule-Louis Turinetti.

=== July–September ===
- July 5 – Prince Ernest Augustus is created Duke of York and Albany, in the peerage of Great Britain.
- July 8 – The Battle of Dynekilen: The Swedish fleet is defeated by a Danish–Norwegian fleet.
- July 8–August 21 – Seventh Ottoman–Venetian War: The Ottoman Empire unsuccessfully lays siege to Corfu, the last bastion of the Republic of Venice in the Greek islands.
- August 3 – Natchez, one of the oldest towns on the Mississippi River, is founded by French civilians at the site of Fort Rosalie.
- August 4 – George Seton, 5th Earl of Winton, under sentence of death for his part in the Jacobite rising of 1715, escapes from the Tower of London and flees into exile on the continent.
- August 5 – Battle of Petrovaradin: 83,300 Austrian troops of Prince Eugene of Savoy defeat 150,000 Ottoman Turks under Silahdar Damat Ali Pasha (who is killed).
- August 24 – Charles VI, Holy Roman Emperor, returns from Italy.
- September 15 – "Maria", an African slave of the Dutch West India Company on the Caribbean island of Curaçao, murders the plantation overseer, Christiaan Muller, then leads a rebellion, killing Muller's family and much of the white staff on the company's plantation. The uprising is suppressed after 10 days, and Maria is executed by burning at the stake on November 9.
- September 26 – Alexei Petrovich, Tsarevich of Russia, eldest son of the Tsar Peter the Great and heir to the throne, flees from Saint Petersburg with his mistress, Efrosinya Fedorova, along with her brother and three servants. After spending more than a year in Austria, he returns to Russia where he is arrested and dies in prison in 1718.

=== October–December ===
- October 12 – During the war between the Habsburg Empire ruling Austria and the Ottoman Empire ruling Turkey, the six week siege of the fortified city of Temeşvar ends with it being surrendered by the Turks to the Austrians. Under a flag of truce, the Turks are permitted to depart but have to leave behind their artillery as they give up their claim to Hungary. Austro-Hungarian rule lasts until World War One, and in 1919, the city of Timișoara becomes part of the Kingdom of Romania.
- November 1 – Two new laws go into effect in the Highlands of Scotland to prevent a threat to Britain's ruling House of Hanover by the Jacobites who supported the restoration of the House of Stuart. The Disarming Act requires government authorisation to carry swords and firearms, and the amendments to the Treason Act 1714 permit trials for treason to take place in any court in England, regardless of where the crime was committed.
- December 4 – Fifty people are killed, and 150 houses burned, when a fire breaks out in Wapping, London. The blaze comes two days after a fire at the Spring Gardens at St. James's, London, which destroyed the French Chapel there and which was put out by several rescuers, including the future King George II.
- December 12 – Charles Townshend, 2nd Viscount Townshend, is demoted from his office as Secretary of State for the Northern Department in the British government, and replaced by James Stanhope, 1st Earl Stanhope. This is a move towards the Whig Split of 1717.

=== Date unknown ===
- English pirate Edward Teach (Blackbeard) is given command of a sloop in the Bahamas.
- Tsar Peter the Great of Russia studies with the physician Herman Boerhaave, at Leiden University.
- The Kangxi Dictionary is published, laying the foundation of most references to Han characters studied in the future.

== Births ==
=== January ===
- January 1 – Joshua Loring, colonial American captain in British service (d. 1781), Gaspar de Portola, Spanish California Expedition (d.1786)
- January 4 – Aaron Burr Sr., President of Princeton University (d. 1757)
- January 11 – Edmund Sheffield, 2nd Duke of Buckingham and Normanby, English nobleman (d. 1735)
- January 12 – Antonio de Ulloa, Spanish general and scientist (d. 1795)
- January 15
  - Philip Livingston, American politician (d. 1778)
  - Pierre-Marie-Jérôme Trésaguet, French scientist (d. 1796)

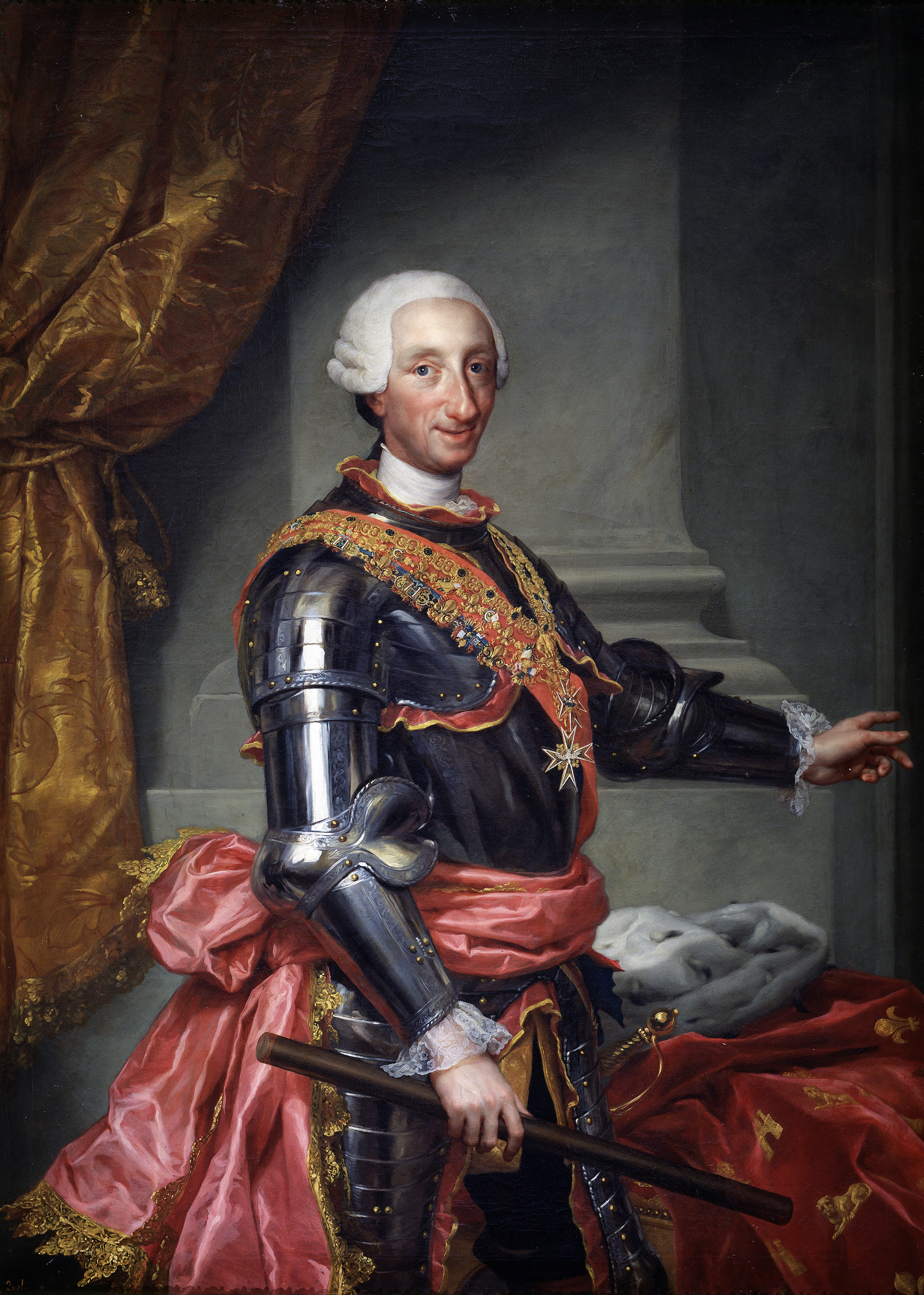
Charles III of Spain

- January 20
  - King Charles III of Spain (d. 1788)
  - Jean-Jacques Barthélemy, French writer and numismatist (d. 1795)
  - Franz Wilhelm Rabaliatti, German architect (d. 1782)
- January 26 – George Germain, 1st Viscount Sackville, British Army general (d. 1785)
- January 30 – Carl Fredrik Adelcrantz, Swedish architect and civil servant (d. 1796)

=== February ===
- February 2 – David Graeme, British Army general (d. 1797)
- February 4 – José Solís Folch de Cardona, Spanish colonial governor (d. 1770)
- February 8 – Pasquale Cafaro, Italian composer (d. 1787)
- February 9 – Mary Palmer, English writer (d. 1794)
- February 23 – Antoine-Joseph Pernety, French writer (d. 1796)

=== March ===
- March 6 – Pehr Kalm, Finnish scientist (d. 1779)
- March 13 – Princess Philippine Charlotte of Prussia (d. 1801)
- March 18 – Friedrich Wilhelm, Graf von Wylich und Lottum, Prussian army officer (d. 1774)
- March 19 – Guillaume Coustou the Younger, French artist (d. 1777)
- March 21 – Josef Seger, Czech composer and organist (d. 1782)

=== April ===
- April 1 – Morgan Rhys, Welsh hymn-writer (d. 1779)
- April 5 – Jeremiah Theus, American artist (d. 1774)
- April 12 – Felice Giardini, Italian composer, violinist (d. 1796)
- April 24 – Johann Georg Weishaupt, German lawyer (d. 1753)

=== May ===
- May 2 – Infante Carlos of Portugal, Portuguese infante (prince) (d. 1736)
- May 8 – James Wright, Governor of Georgia (d. 1785)
- May 20 – Friedrich Samuel Bock, German philosopher and theologian (d. 1785)
- May 24 – Constantine, Landgrave of Hesse-Rotenburg (d. 1778)
- May 28 – Sir Robert Burdett, 4th Baronet, British politician and member of the English gentry (d. 1797)
- May 29 – Louis-Jean-Marie Daubenton, French scientist (d. 1799)

=== June ===
- June 10 – Carl Gustaf Ekeberg, Swedish explorer (d. 1784)
- June 18
  - Charles Edzard, Prince of East Frisia (d. 1744)
  - Joseph-Marie Vien, French painter (d. 1809)
- June 23 – Fletcher Norton, 1st Baron Grantley (d. 1789)
- June 25 – Johann Baptist Babel, Swiss sculptor (d. 1799)
- June 26 – Charles-Nicolas d'Oultremont, Roman Catholic bishop (d. 1771)
- June 27 – Louise Diane d'Orléans, last child of Philippe II, Duke of Orléans (d. 1736)

=== July ===
- July 3 – Philipp Gotthard von Schaffgotsch, German Prince-Bishop (d. 1795)
- July 14 – Michael Schlatter, American clergyman (d. 1790)
- July 17 – William Errington, English priest (d. 1768)
- July 22 – Jan Jakub Zamoyski, Polish noble (d. 1790)

=== August ===
- August 2 – Richard Edgcumbe, 2nd Baron Edgcumbe, British baron, politician (d. 1761)
- August 4 – Sir John Dashwood-King, 3rd Baronet, English country gentleman (d. 1793)
- August 8
  - Andrea Spagni, Italian theologian (d. 1788)
  - Thomas Foley, 1st Baron Foley, British politician (d. 1777)
- August 15 – Karl Joseph von Firmian, Austrian diplomat (d. 1782)
- August 18 – Johan Maurits Mohr, Dutch-German pastor and astronomer (d. 1775)

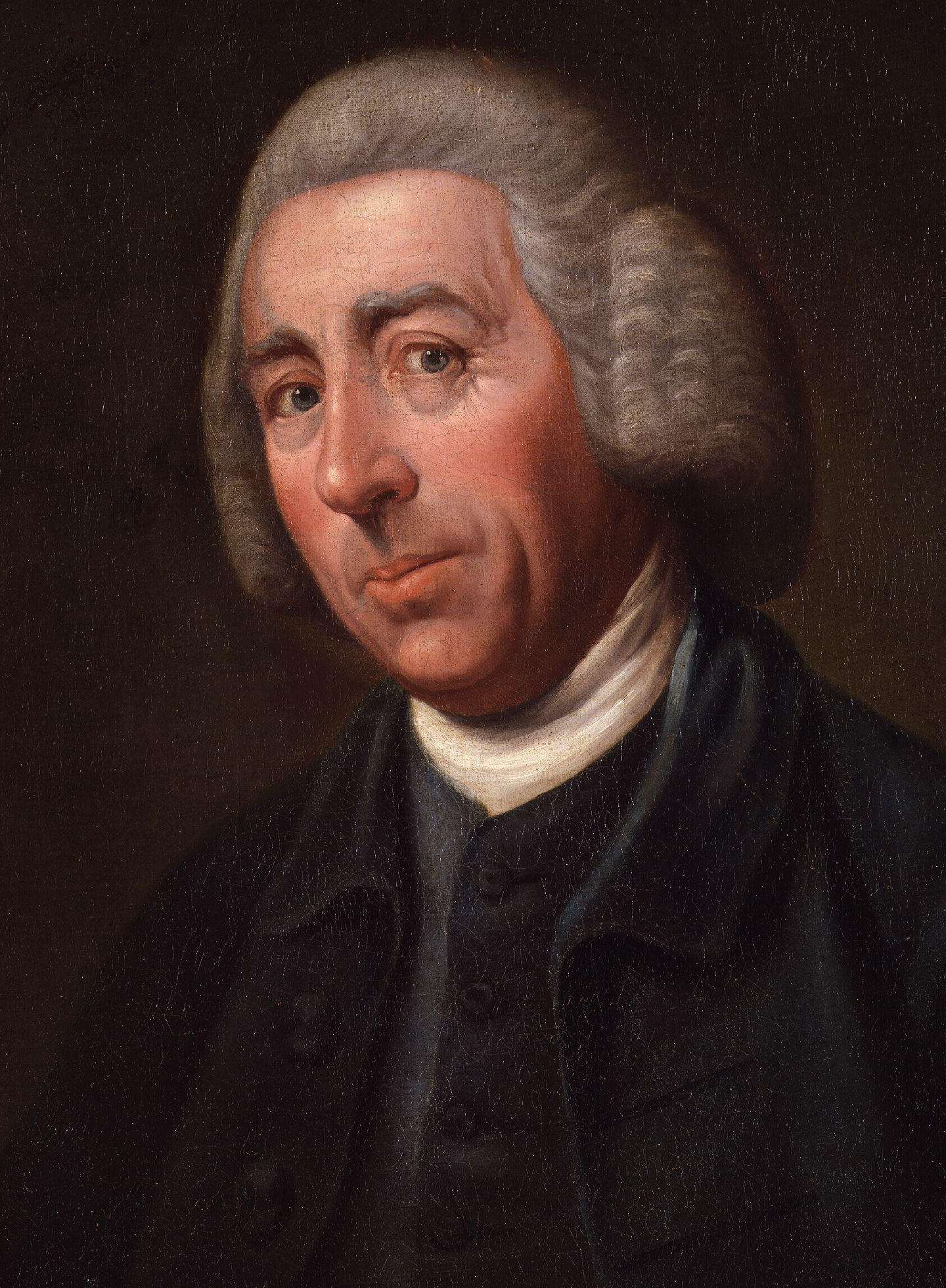
Lancelot Brown

- August 30 – Capability Brown, English landscape architect (d. 1783)

=== September ===
- September 2 – Jacques-Nicolas Tardieu, French engraver (d. 1791)
- September 6 – Charles Bennet, 3rd Earl of Tankerville, British Earl (d. 1767)
- September 16 – Angelo Maria Amorevoli, Italian musician (d. 1798)
- September 19 – Jan Jacob Schultens, Dutch linguist (d. 1788)
- October 1 – Benjamin Waller, American politician (d. 1786)
- October 3 – Giovanni Battista Beccaria, Italian physicist (d. 1781)
- October 4 – James Lind, Scottish physician (d. 1794)
- October 5 – Alexei Senyavin, Russian admiral (d. 1797)
- October 6 – George Montagu-Dunk, 2nd Earl of Halifax, British statesman (d. 1771)
- October 8 – Gaspar of Braganza, Archbishop of Braga, Portuguese clergyman (d. 1780)
- October 16 – Lord Augustus FitzRoy, Royal Navy officer during the War of the Austrian Succession (d. 1741)
- October 26 – Charles Christian Erdmann, Duke of Württemberg-Oels (d. 1792)

=== November ===
- November 1
  - William Foye, Canadian politician (d. 1771)
  - Joseph Dinouart, French preacher (d. 1786)
- November 4 – Wilhelm von Knyphausen, Prussian soldier (d. 1800)
- November 16 – John Monro, British physician of Bethlem Hospital (d. 1791)
- November 26 – Elizabeth Percy, Duchess of Northumberland, British duchess; Lady of the Bedchamber (d. 1776)

=== December ===
- December 1 – Étienne Maurice Falconet, French artist (d. 1791)
- December 7 – Henry Ernest of Stolberg-Wernigerode, German politician, canon, provost and author of numerous hymns (d. 1778)
- December 12 – Leopoldine Marie of Anhalt-Dessau, Margravine of Brandenburg-Schwedt (d. 1782)
- December 16
  - Johann Rudolf Tschiffeli, Swiss agronomist (d. 1780)
  - Louis Jules Mancini Mazarini, French diplomat and writer (d. 1798)
- December 23 – Johann Heinrich Rolle, German baroque composer (d. 1785)
- December 25 – Johann Jakob Reiske, German scholar (d. 1774)
- December 26
  - Thomas Gray, English poet, historian (d. 1771)
  - Jean François de Saint-Lambert, French poet, philosopher and military officer (d. 1803)
- December 27 – Leonardo Ximenes, Italian mathematician (d. 1786)

=== Approximate date ===
- Arnarsaq, Inuit translator, interpreter and missionary (d. after 1771)
- Catherine Théot, French visionary (d. 1794)
- Anna Margareta Salmelin, Finnish prisoner of war (d. 1789)

=== Date unknown ===
- Josip Kazimir Drašković, Croatian General in the Seven Years' War (1756–1763) (d. 1765)

== Deaths ==
=== January ===
- January 1 – William Wycherley, English playwright (b. 1641)
- January 18 – Sir Robert Burdett, 3rd Baronet, English politician (b. 1640)
- January 30 – Marie Casimire Louise de La Grange d'Arquien, French-born Polish consort to King John III Sobieski (b. 1641)

=== February ===
- February 2 – Juan Domingo de Zuñiga y Fonseca, Spanish Governor of the Habsburg Netherlands (b. 1640)
- February 19 – Dorothe Engelbretsdotter, Norway's first professional female author (b. 1634)

=== March ===
- March 26 – Johann Friedrich Gleditsch, German book publisher (b. 1653)
- March 28 – John Vesey, Irish archbishop (b. 1638)

=== April ===
- April 14 – Arthur Herbert, 1st Earl of Torrington, British admiral (b. c. 1648)
- April 26 – John Somers, 1st Baron Somers, Lord Chancellor of England (b. 1651)
- April 28 – Saint Louis de Montfort, author, True Devotion to Mary (b. 1673)
- April 29 – Sir Richard Myddelton, 3rd Baronet, English politician (b. 1655)

=== May ===
- May 11 – Francis de Geronimo, Italian priest (b. 1642)
- May 14 – Henry Oxburgh, executed Irish Jacobite leader

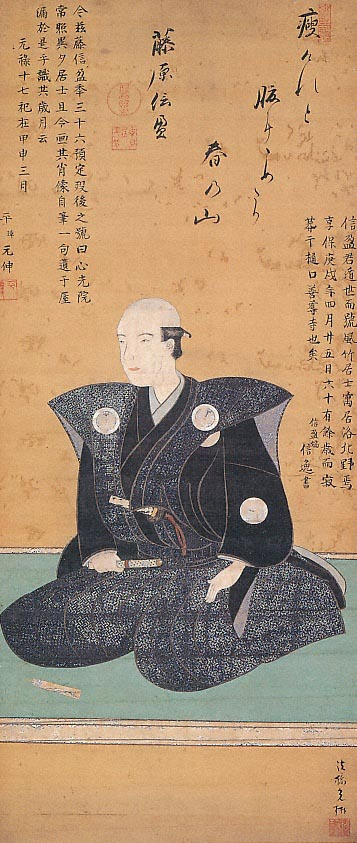
Painting by Ogata Kōrin.

=== June ===
- June 2 – Ogata Kōrin, Japanese painter (b. c. 1657)
- June 5 – Roger Cotes, English mathematician and philosopher (b. 1682)
- June 8 – Johann Wilhelm, Elector Palatine (b. 1658)
- June 9 – Banda Bahadur, Sikh military commander (executed) (b. 1670)
- June 19 – Tokugawa Ietsugu, 7th Tokugawa shogunate of Japan (b. 1709)
- June 28 – George FitzRoy, 1st Duke of Northumberland, English general (b. 1665)

=== July ===
- July 8 – Robert South, English churchman (b. 1634)
- July 9 – Joseph Sauveur, French mathematician (b. 1653)
- July 14 – Edward Lee, 1st Earl of Lichfield, English peer (b. 1663)
- July 26 – Paolo Alessandro Maffei, Italian antiquarian, humanist (b. 1653)

=== August ===
- August 5 – Silahtar Ali Pasha, Ottoman (Turkish) grand vizier (b. 1667)
- August 6 – Frederick Augustus, Duke of Württemberg-Neuenstadt (b. 1654)

=== September ===
- September 25 – Johann Christoph Pez, German composer (b. 1664)

=== October ===
- October 17 – Anne Hamilton, 3rd Duchess of Hamilton, Scottish peeress (b. 1631)
- October 28 – Stephen Fox, English politician (b. 1627)
- October 10 – Anton Egon, Prince of Fürstenberg-Heiligenberg, Governor of the Electorate of Saxony (b. 1656)

=== November ===
- November 2 – Engelbert Kaempfer, German traveler, physician (b. 1651)
- November 9 – Maria, Curaçaoan slave rebel leader

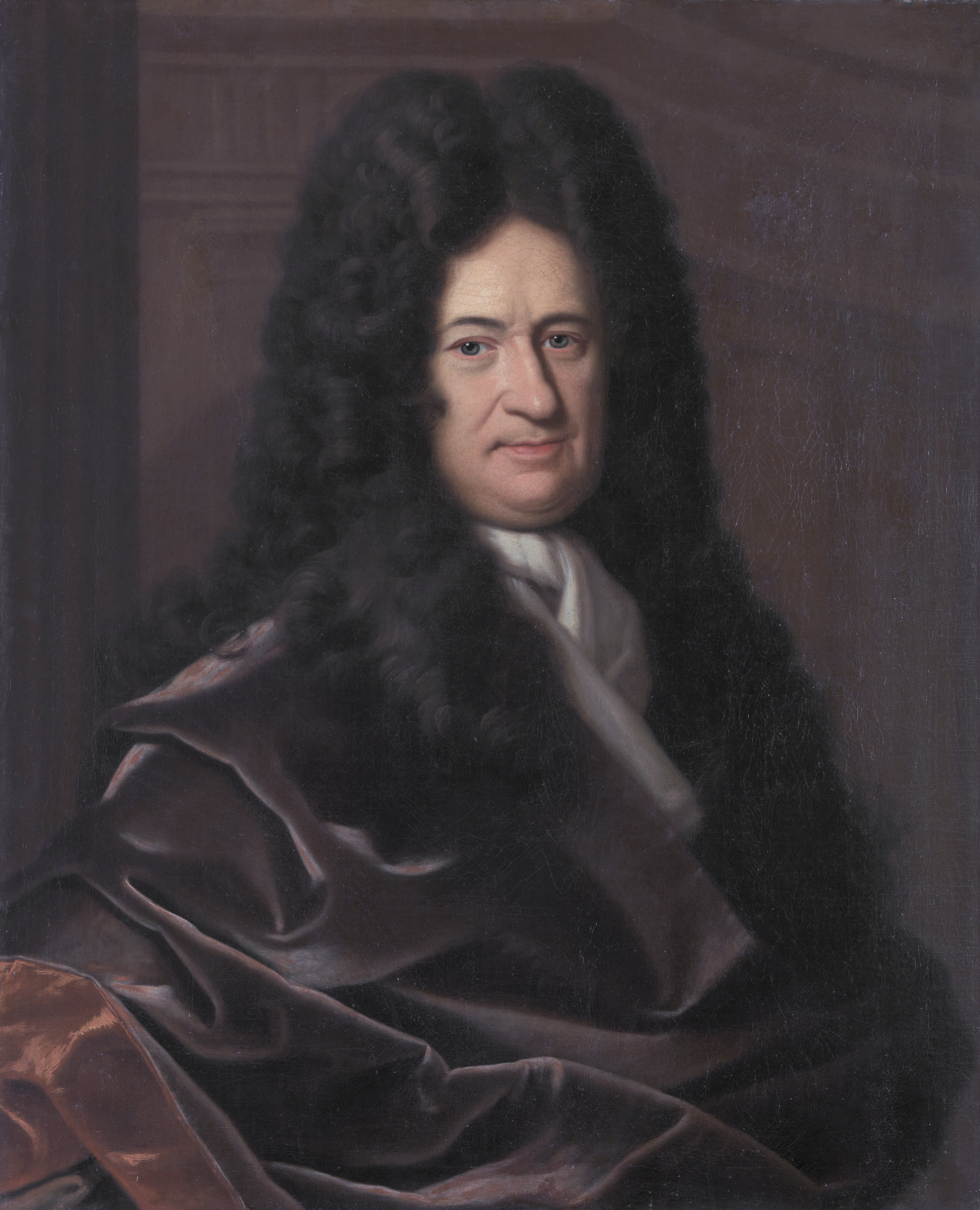
Gottfried Wilhelm Leibniz

- November 14 – Gottfried Leibniz, German philosopher, scientist, and mathematician (b. 1646)
- November 22 – Inaba Masamichi, Japanese daimyō (b. 1640)
- November 26 – Nils Bielke, member of the High Council of Sweden (b. 1644)
- November 29 – Ofspring Blackall, Bishop of Exeter (b. 1655)

=== December ===
- December 5 – William Ettrick, English politician (b. 1651)
- December 13 – Charles de La Fosse, French painter (b. 1640)
- December 14 – William Trumbull, English diplomat and politician (b. 1639)

=== Date unknown ===
- Stefano Erardi, Maltese painter (b. 1630)
- Lalla Aisha Mubarka, Empress of Morocco
- Samuel Weston, English politician
