= Sablika =

Free Black woman during 1795 Curaçao Slave Revolt

Sablika (fl. 1795), or possibly Sablica, was a free black woman who lived on Curaçao at the time of the Slave Revolt of 1795. Little is known about her with absolute certainty. There are no historical sources to confirm accounts that she was a resistance fighter and a close associate of Tula, the leader of the rebellion. In the 21st century, she has become a symbol for female resistance fighters who remain invisible in recorded history

== Biography ==
In the Dutch historical records of the Curaçao Slave Revolt of 1795, a woman named Sablica is mentioned three times. After the revolt was put down, she was described by Dutch government officials in an interrogation report as “a free negro woman who is a conniving and infamous thief, and the so-called wife of Nicolaas Valentijn, who has already been executed. She can be brought to no other confession than that she buried a petticoat, a camisole and three children's shirts, but afterwards returned them.” Nothing is mentioned about her having played a prominent role in the rebellion.

Tambú song is one of the ways in which Curaçao's enslaved community preserved and passed on its own history. In the song Rebeldia na Bandabou (Revolt in Bandabou) a woman named Sablika is mentioned together with Pedro Wacao and Louis Mercier as the fighters by the side of Tula, the leader of the revolt. Wacao and Mercier are known to have been lieutenants of Tula. It cannot however be said with certainty how old the song is, nor is it clear whether this Sablica is the woman mentioned in the archival documents. Rebeldia na Bandabou is still sung on Curaçao.

In the 21st century, interest in Sablika grew, and previously unknown stories about her began to circulate. She is claimed to have been Tula's romantic partner. Father Jacobus Schink, a roman-catholic priest who maintained contact with the insurgents during the revolt, is claimed to have written Sablika a letter to which she replied with wit and self confidence. However, no historical sources confirm Sablika's relationship with Tula, or her correspondence with Schink.

On Curaçao and in the Netherlands, the figure of Sablika has become a symbol for female resistance fighters who remain invisible in recorded history.
