= Tula: The Revolt =

- Theatrical release poster
- Directed by: Jeroen Leinders
- Screenplay by: Curtis Holt Hawkins
- Starring: Obi Abili; Danny Glover; Jeroen Krabbé
- Cinematography: Dolph Van Stapele
- Edited by: Herman P. Koerts
- Music by: Guy Farley
- Production company: Fisheye Feature Films
- Distributed by: Benelux Film Distributors
- Release date: 4 July 2013 (Netherlands)
- Running time: 100 minutes
- Countries: Netherlands; Curaçao
- Languages: English, Dutch
- Budget: $ 4 million

Tula: The Revolt is a 2013 Dutch-Curaçaoan historical drama film directed by Jeroen Leinders. The film tells the life story of the slave Tula (Obi Abili) who lead the Slave Revolt of 1795 on Curaçao in the Dutch West Indies. The film premiered on 24 June 2013 (worldwide) and on 11 July 2013 Curaçao.

== Cast ==
- Obi Abili as Tula
- Danny Glover as Shinishi
- Jeroen Krabbé as Gouvernor De Veer
- Deobia Oparei as Hacha
- Paul Bazely as Louis
- Derek de Lint as Baron Van Westerholt
- Aden Gillett as Father Schinck
- Jeroen Willems as Van Uytrecht
- Doña Croll as Old Mama Pretu

== Awards ==
- Grand Jury Prize (2013) at the London Film Awards
- Best Film (2014) at the San Diego Black Film Festival
- Best Lead Actor (2014) at the San Diego Black Film Festival

== See also ==
- List of films featuring slavery
