= Curaçao Slave Revolt of 1795 =

Caribbean insurgency

- Part of the Slave Revolts in North America
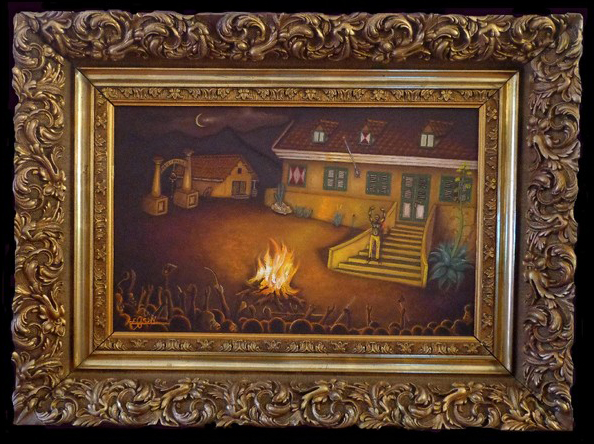
- Edsel Selberie: Victoria na Porto Mari 1795. Modern artist's impression of the victory of the slaves at Portomari, Curaçao.
- Date: 17 August 1795 – 19 September 1795
- Location: Curaçao, Dutch West Indies
- Goals: End to collective punishment, better working conditions, consumer freedom
- Methods: Uprising
- Result: Revolt suppressed. Slaves received limited rights.

Parties
Slaves	(Batavian Republic) Batavian Republic; Curaçao

Lead figures
Tula (executed); Bastian Karpata (executed); Louis Mercier (executed); Pedro Wakao (executed)	(Batavian Republic) Johannes de Veer (Batavian Republic) Commander Wierts (Batavian Republic) Lieutenant Plegher (Batavian Republic) Baron Westerholt

Number
c. 2,000	

Casualties and losses
c. 100	2

Casualties
- Deaths: 9 slaves, 1 white schoolmaster; Tula (rebel leader), Karpata (rebel leader), Mercier (rebel leader), Wakao (rebel leader)
- Arrested: 12 slaves

The Curaçao Slave Revolt of 1795 was a slave revolt in the Dutch colony of Curaçao, led by the enslaved man Tula (Toela in a contemporary Dutch report). It resulted in a month-long conflict on the island between escapees and the colonial government. Tula was aware of the Haitian Revolution that had resulted in freedom for the enslaved in Haiti. He argued that, since the European Netherlands was now under French occupation as a sister republic, the slaves on Curaçao should get their freedom as well.

== Revolt ==
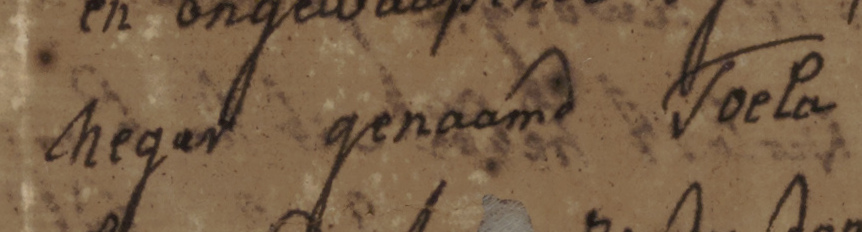
Manuscript text fragment "neger genaamd Toela" (negro called Toela) from the report by catholic priest Jacobus Schinck of 7 September 1795.

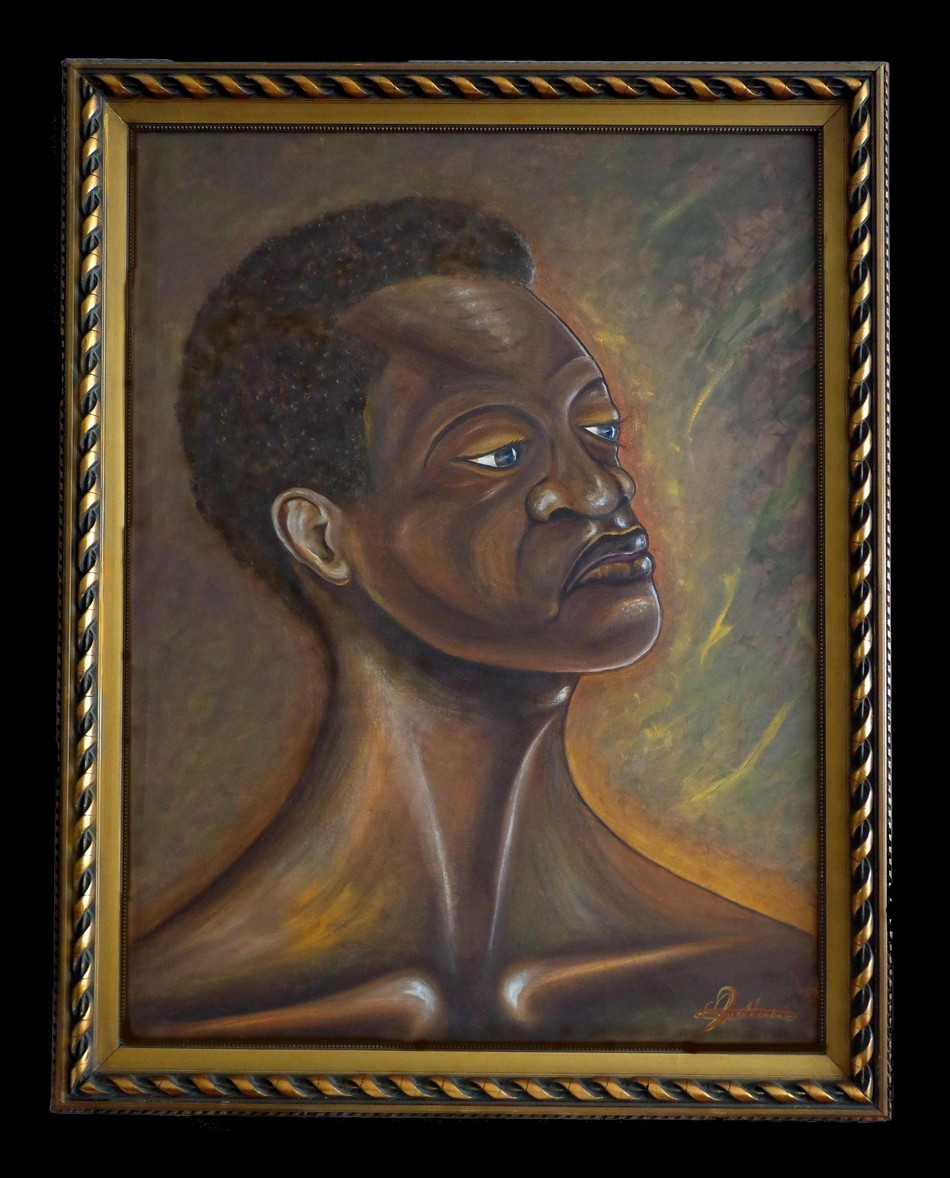
Edsel Selberie: Tula. Modern artist's impression of the rebel leader.

At the 1789 census, Curaçao had 20,988 inhabitants of which 4,410 were white, 3,714 were free people of color, and 12,864 enslaved people. On the morning of 17 August 1795, Tula led an uprising of 40 to 50 people at the Knip plantation of Caspar Lodewijk van Uytrecht in Bandabou. The slaves had been preparing the insurrection for some weeks. They met on the square of the plantation and informed van Uytrecht they would no longer be his slaves. He told them to present their complaints to the lieutenant governor at Fort Amsterdam. They left and went from Knip to Lagún, where they freed 22 people from jail.

From Lagún, the liberators went to the sugar plantation of Santa Cruz, where they were joined by more rebels under Bastian Karpata. Tula then led the liberated people from farm to farm, freeing more people. The slave owners had now retreated to the city, leaving their plantations unprotected. At the same time, a confederate French slave, Louis Mercier, led another group of freed people to Santa Cruz, where he took the commandant, van der Grijp, and ten of his mixed-race soldiers as prisoners. Mercier also attacked Knip, where he freed more people and took some weapons. He then rejoined Tula, locating him by following the trail of destruction he had left behind.

== Response ==
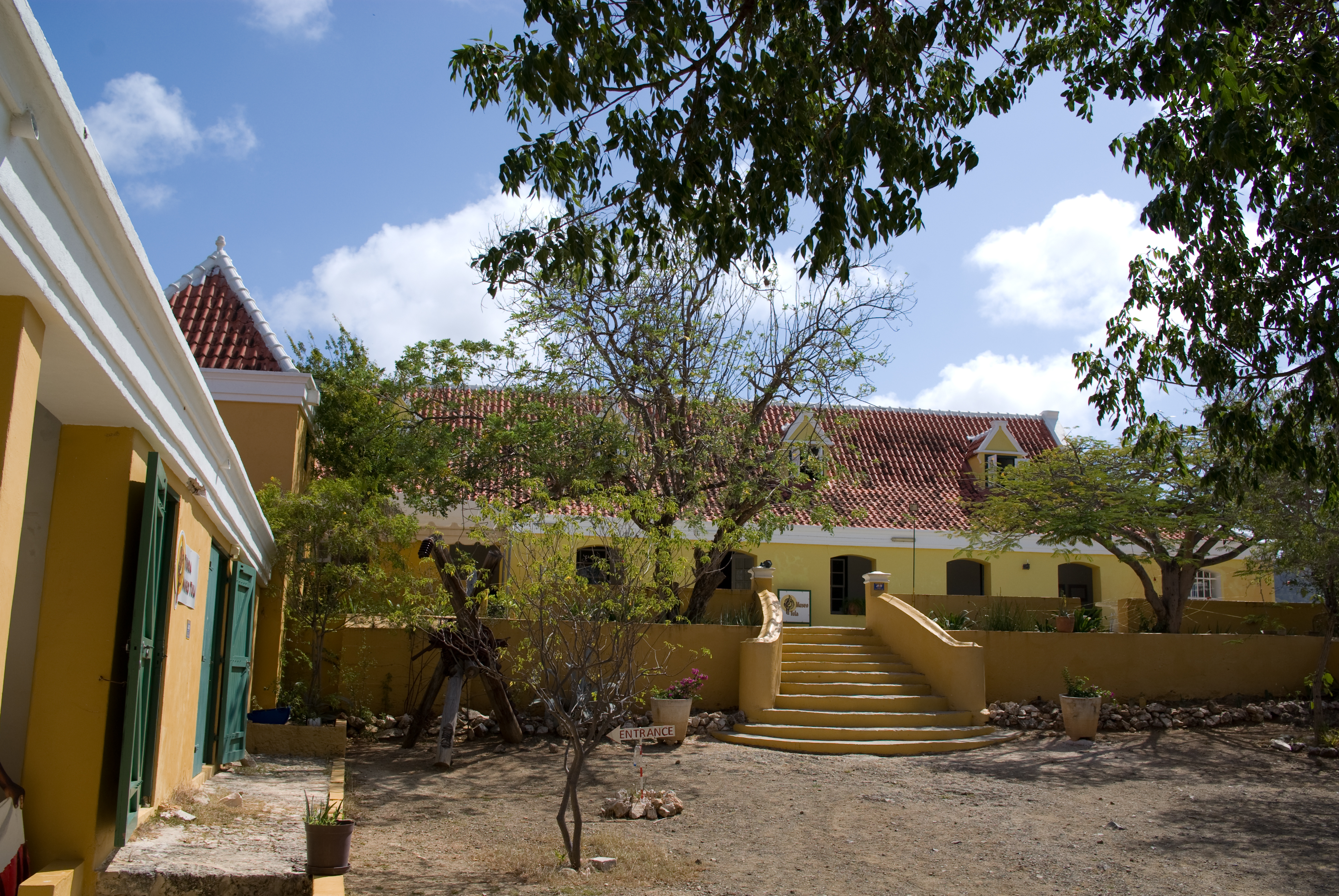
Landhuis Kenepa (Kenepa Plantation House), 2010

Van Uytrecht in the meantime had sent his son on horseback with a note to the governor, and at 7 p.m., the council met to prepare a defense of the colony. Governor Johannes de Veer ordered Commander Wierts of the navy ship Medea to defend Fort Amsterdam. A force of 67 men, both white and black, under the command of Lieutenant R. G. Plegher was sent against the rebels. They went by boat to Boca San Michiel from Willemstad, and from there on foot to Portomari, where Tula and his followers were camping. When the Dutch military arrived there on August 19, they attacked Tula's group, but were defeated.

At the plantation of Fontein, Louis Mercier killed the Dutch schoolmaster, Sabel, who became the first white victim of the rebellion. Wakao also found more weapons at Fontein.

The governor was notified of Plegher's defeat, and the rebellion was now considered a serious threat to the white community. The governor and the slavers had raised a force of 93 well-armed horsemen under the command of Captain Baron van Westerholt to renew the attack. Westerholt had orders to offer leniency to the rebels if they would surrender. Among this party was Jacobus Schink, a Franciscan priest who served as negotiator and attempted to prevent bloodshed. The three demands of Tula were: an end to collective punishment, an end to labor on Sunday, and the freedom to buy clothes and goods from others than their own masters. There were two attempts at negotiating with the enslaved. When Father Schink spoke with Tula, he refused to accept anything less than freedom. Schink reported back to Baron Westerholt, and the latter decided to get more reinforcements and attack. Westerholt attempted a last negotiation, but when he was turned down by the rebels, he ordered that any enslaved person with a weapon be shot. In the ensuing fight, the rebels were defeated. Nine were killed, 12 were taken prisoner, and the rest escaped.

== Final suppression and aftermath ==
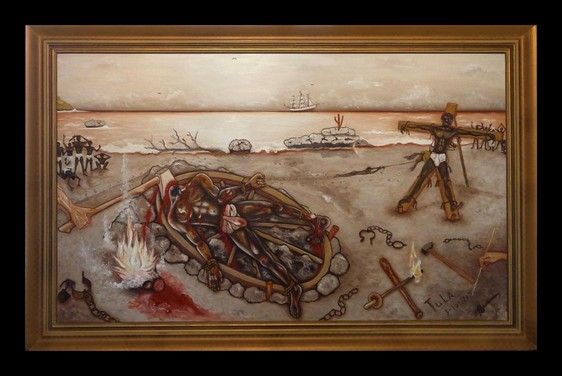
Edsel Selberie: Ehekushon di Tula (The execution of Tula)

The remaining rebels began a guerrilla campaign, poisoning wells and stealing food. On 19 September, Tula and Karpata were betrayed by a slave named Caspar Lodewijk. They were taken prisoner, and the war was effectively over. Louis Mercier had already been caught at Knip. After Tula was captured, he was publicly tortured to death on 3 October 1795, almost seven weeks after the revolt began. Karpata, Louis Mercier, and Pedro Wakao were also executed. In addition, many enslaved people had been massacred in the earlier repression. After the revolt had been crushed, the colonial government granted some rights to enslaved people on the island to prevent another revolt.

== Legacy ==
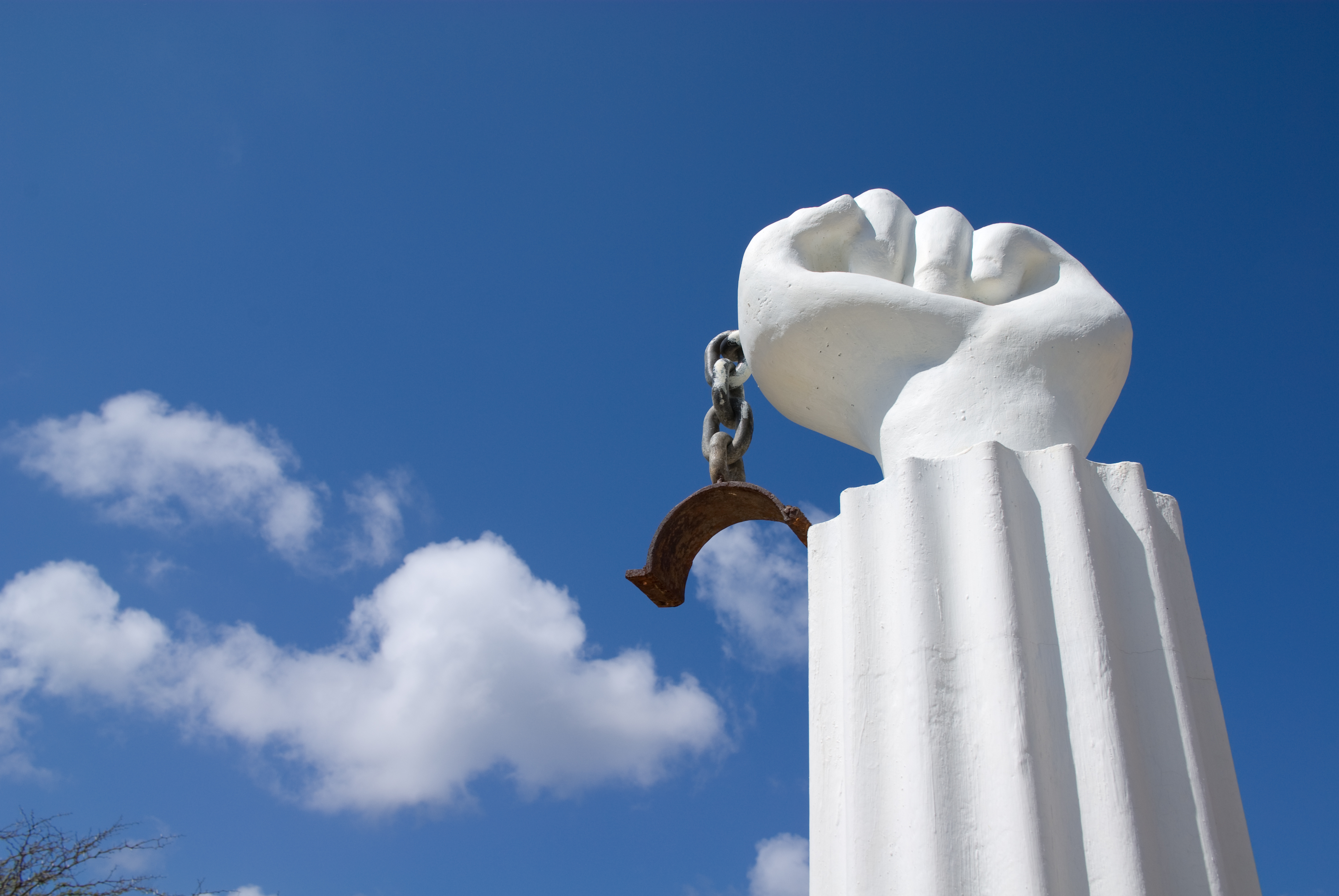
Monument commemorating the start of the 1795 Slave Revolt at Curaçao.

Slavery was not abolished on Curaçao until 1863, when there were 5,498 enslaved people living on the island. Today, 17 August is celebrated as the beginning of the liberation struggle. There is a monument to Tula and the rebels on the south coast of Curaçao where Tula was executed, near the modern-day Corendon Mangrove Beach Resort. The Tula Museum is named after the rebel leader.

Although Tula remains at the centre of the commemoration of the revolt, other leading figures are now also receiving attention, such as Carpata, Pedro Wacao, Louis Mercier and Sablika.

The revolt was dramatized in the 2013 Dutch film Tula: The Revolt, directed by Jeroen Leinders and starring Obi Abili as Tula alongside Jeroen Krabbé and Danny Glover.

== Bibliography ==
- Oostindie, Gert (2011). "Slave Resistance, colour lines, and the impact of the French and Haitian revolutions in Curacao". In Klooster, Wim; Oostindie, Gert (eds.). Curacao in the Age of Revolutions, 1795 - 1800. The Netherlands: KITLV Press. ISBN 978-90-6718-380-2.
- (in Dutch) Paula, A.F. (ed.), Zeventien vijf en negentig. De slavenopstand op Curaçao. Een bronnenuitgave van de originele overheidsdocumenten, 1974.
- (in Dutch) Encyclopedie van de Nederlandse Antillen, Walburg Pers, 1985, ISBN 90-6011-360-8
