= Daaibooi =

Beach in Curaçao

- Beach
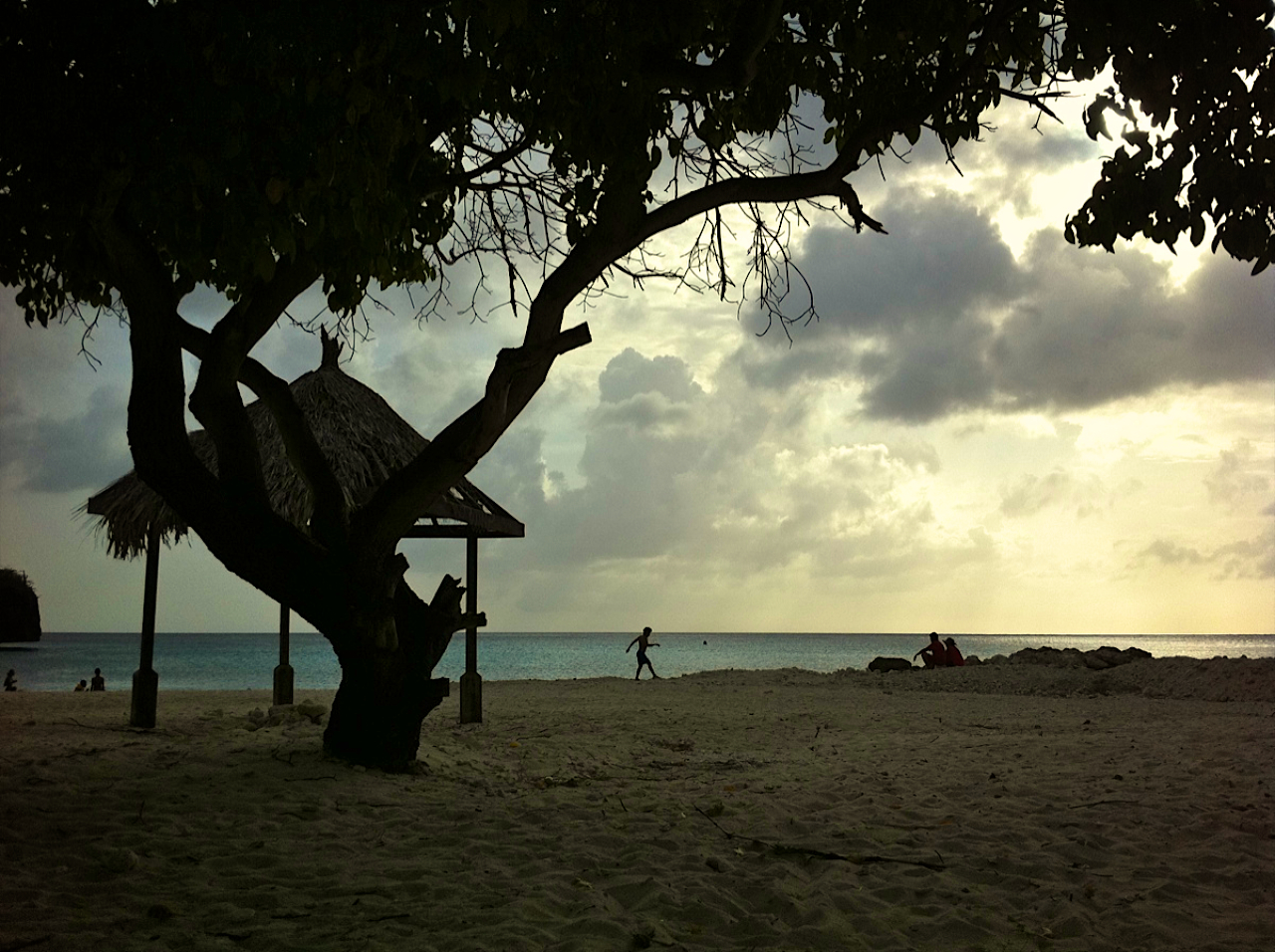
- Daaibooi, April 2011

- Location in Curaçao
- Coordinates: 12°12′44″N 69°05′04″W
- Location: Sint Willibrordus, Curaçao

Daaibooi is a beach on the Caribbean island of Curaçao, located close to the village of Sint Willibrordus, a 30 minutes drive to the north-west of Willemstad. The beach is in a secluded bay, surrounded by cliffs. The loggerhead sea turtle is known to nestle here. The beach is used as a starting point for scuba diving. There is a basic restaurant.
