= Sint Willibrordus =

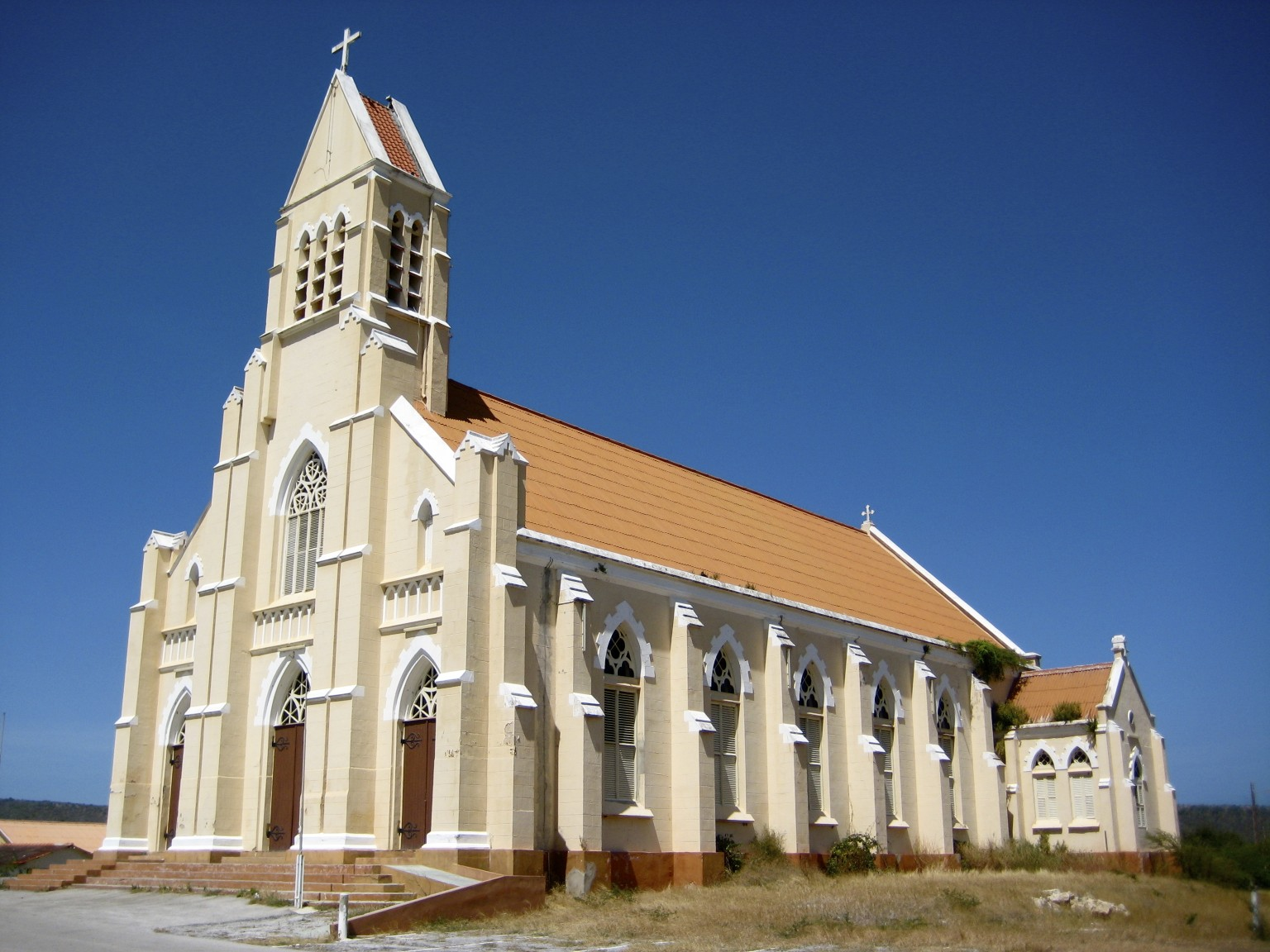
- St. Willibrordus Church

- Location in Curaçao
- Coordinates: 12.217°N 69.065°W
- State: Kingdom of the Netherlands
- Country: Curaçao
- District: Bandabou

Area
  - Total: 23.52 km^{2} (9.08 sq mi)

Population (2011)
  - Total: 588
  - Density: 25.0/km^{2} (64.7/sq mi)
- Climate: Tropical savanna climate

Sint Willibrordus is a village in Bandabou on the western half of Curaçao, northwest of the Bullen Bay and about 25 km from the capital Willemstad. The village has been called this since the dedication of the church in 1888; until then, the town of Buitenbosch or as called in the Papiaments 'Mondi Afó' was called. The village of several hundred inhabitants has an imposing Roman Catholic church in neo-Gothic style, designed by the Rotterdam architect Evert Margry, for which the first stone was laid by Vincentius Jansen and was built from 1884 to 1888. Earlier in the nineteenth century, a school and an orphanage had been built by mission patrons.

A few kilometres from Saint Willibrordus are two of Curaçao's many picturesque bays: Porto Marie Bay and Daaibooi Bay.

Near the village are some of the salt pans are no longer in use, including those of the salt pan Rif St. Marie, one of the oldest plantations on the island. Now only a few dilapidated walls can be seen. Flamingos regularly stay in the salt pans. Near the village is also the rock formation known as El Indjan (The Indian).

There used to be a connection between the village and the Bullen Bay via the Saliña Sint Marie and the Boka Sint Marie.

== Bibliography ==
- Buurtprofiel Willibrordus (2011). "Buurtprofiel Willibrordus" (PDF). Government of Curaçao (in Dutch).
