= Tera Corá =

Tera Corá Tera Kòrá
- Town
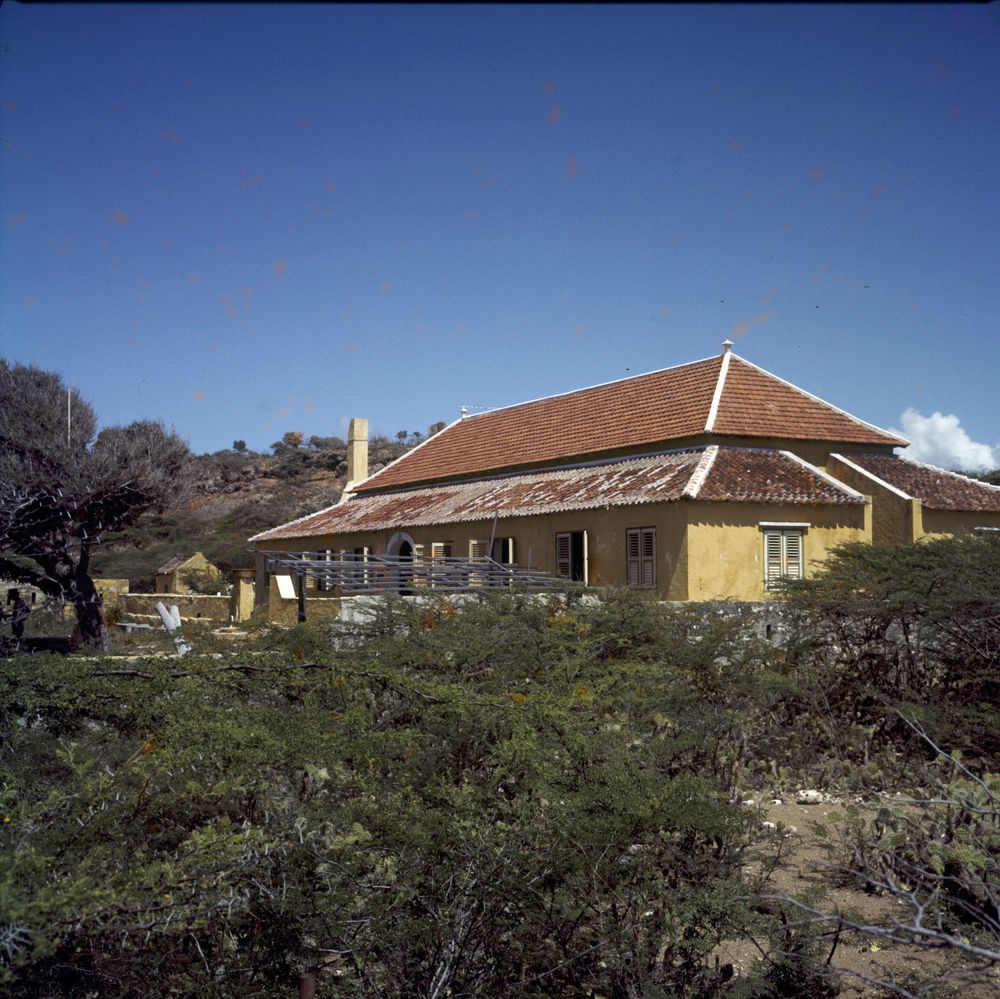
- Landhuis Siberië

- Location in Curaçao
- Coordinates: 12.22443°N 69.02803°W
- State: Kingdom of the Netherlands
- Country: Curaçao
- District: Bandabou

Area
  - Total: 19.25 km^{2} (7.43 sq mi)

Population (2011)
  - Total: 4,388
  - Density: 227.9/km^{2} (590.4/sq mi)

Tera Corá (also Tera Kòrá) is a town in the Bandabou District of Curaçao. It is located near the middle of the island. Grote Berg and Siberië are part of Tera Corá. The name is Papiamentu for "red earth" which is caused by the presence of bauxite.

== History ==
Tera Corá is in the plantation area of the country. Unlike most of the island, the soil is quite fertile. The area used to consist of isolated plantations and some houses along the main road. The town of Tera Corá is a recent addition from the 1950s. Tera Corá was one of the building projects of Fundashon Kas Popular who built almost 700 residential homes in the town between 1980 and 1998. A large wind turbine park was constructed in 1993, and expanded in 2016.

== Grote Berg ==
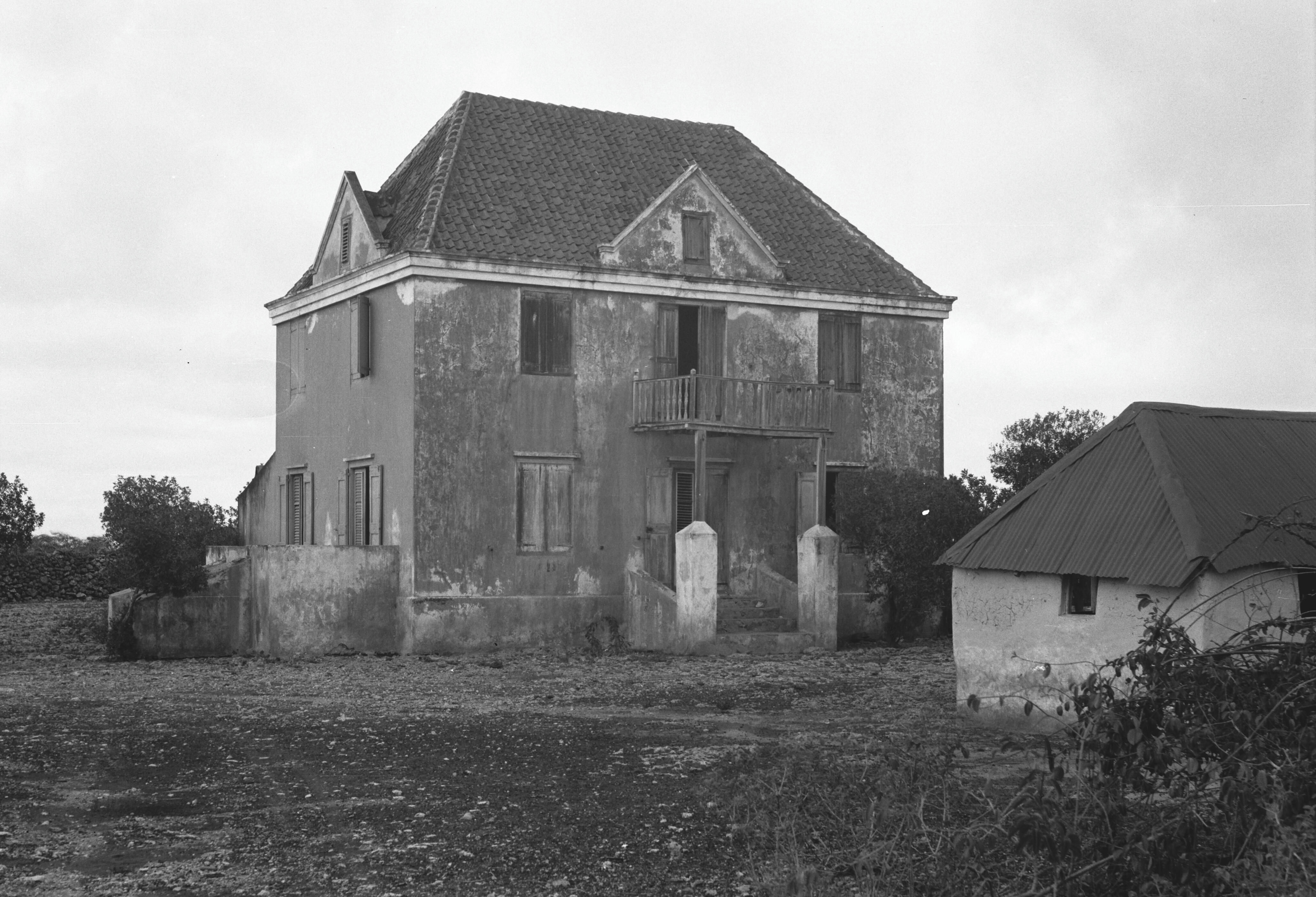
Landhuis Grote Berg (1954)

Grote Berg only consisted of Landhuis Grote Berg, a country estate, with no human habitation in the surrounding area. The terrain was bought by Eduardo Halabi who started to transform the area into a residential zone. 900 houses are planned to be built in Grote Berg. The town contains a big shopping mall, restaurants, bars, and has 24-hour security.

== Plantation Siberië ==
Siberië is a plantation from 1784. The Dutch word translates to Siberia, however it is a reference to Siberio Cafiero, one of the founders of the plantation. Siberië is the only plantation in the area which is still in operation. The ruins of the slave wall which was built to prevent escapes are still present on the grounds. The plantation produces oranges for the liqueur industry, and raises goats.

== Bibliography ==
- Buurtprofiel Tera Cora (2011). "Buurtprofiel Tera Cora" (PDF). Government of Curaçao (in Dutch).
