= Playa Santa Cruz =

Beach in Curaçao

- Beach
- Location in Curaçao
- Coordinates: 12°18′22″N 69°08′42″W
- Location: Lagún, Curaçao

Playa Santa Cruz is a beach on the Caribbean island of Curaçao, located to the south of the village of Lagun. It is a wide, sandy beach. There are beach cabins and a snack bar that opens irregularly during weekends.
