= Obi Abili =

British actor (born 1977)

- Born: Obi Abili; 1977 (age 48–49); London, England
- Education: Royal Academy of Dramatic Art
- Occupation: Actor
- Years active: 2006–present

Obi Abili is a British stage, television and film actor of Nigerian descent.

== Early life ==
Obi Abili was born in London, England in 1977 and lived in "material comfort" until the family moved to Nigeria and fell into poverty when he was around 8-years-old. Making his way back to London with his father and siblings by age 12, he spent most of his adolescence in foster homes.

== Career ==
Abili studied at the Royal Academy of Dramatic Art in London (RADA). In 2006, he made his television debut with a role in the television series Afterlife. In 2012, Abili debuted in the film Gambit alongside Colin Firth and Cameron Diaz and in 2013 he starred as Tula: The Revolt.

== Filmography ==
=== Films ===
Year	Title	Role	Notes
2023	Reunion	Mamadou Kargbo	
2021	Spinning Gold	Edwin Hawkins	
2021	The Survivalist	John Larsson	
2020	Violation	Caleb	
2020	Here After	Stranger	Released as Faraway Eyes in 2020 at the Cinequest Film Festival and in the US as Here After in 2021.
2019	21 Bridges	Sgt. Butchco	
2018	London Fields	Thelonius	
2017	Forgotten Man	Executive Slazenger	
2016	Bachelor Games|	Max	
2013	Tula: The Revolt	Tula	
2012	Gambit	Executive Slazenger	

=== Television ===
Year	Title	Role	Notes
2022	Step up: High Water		
2018	Billions	Roland Aduba	2 episodes
2016	Delicious	Reverend Norton	3 episodes
2011	Injustice	DS Nick Taylor	5 episodes
2010	The Nativity	Gaspar	
2010	Foyle’s War	Gabe Kelly	Series 6, ep. 2
2009	The Take	Des	
2009	Moses Jones	Joseph	3 episodes
2008	10 Days to War	James	
2006	Afterlife	Aaron	

=== Podcast Series ===
Year	Title	Role	Notes
2025	The Hookup	PNPeter	Series Regular
2021	See You in Your Nightmares		

=== Theater ===
Year	Title	Role	Venue(s)	Notes	Ref.
2021	The Oresteia	Agamemnon	Theatre for a New Audience	Virtual premiere	
2017	The Emperor Jones	Brutus Jones	Irish Repertory Theatre		
2016	Six Degrees of Separation	Paul	West End theatre		
2015	Antigone	Guard / chorus	Brooklyn Academy of Music	Performance released as a BBC 4 TV Movie titled, Antigone at the Barbican in 2015.	
