= Playa Lagun =

Beach in Curaçao

- Beach
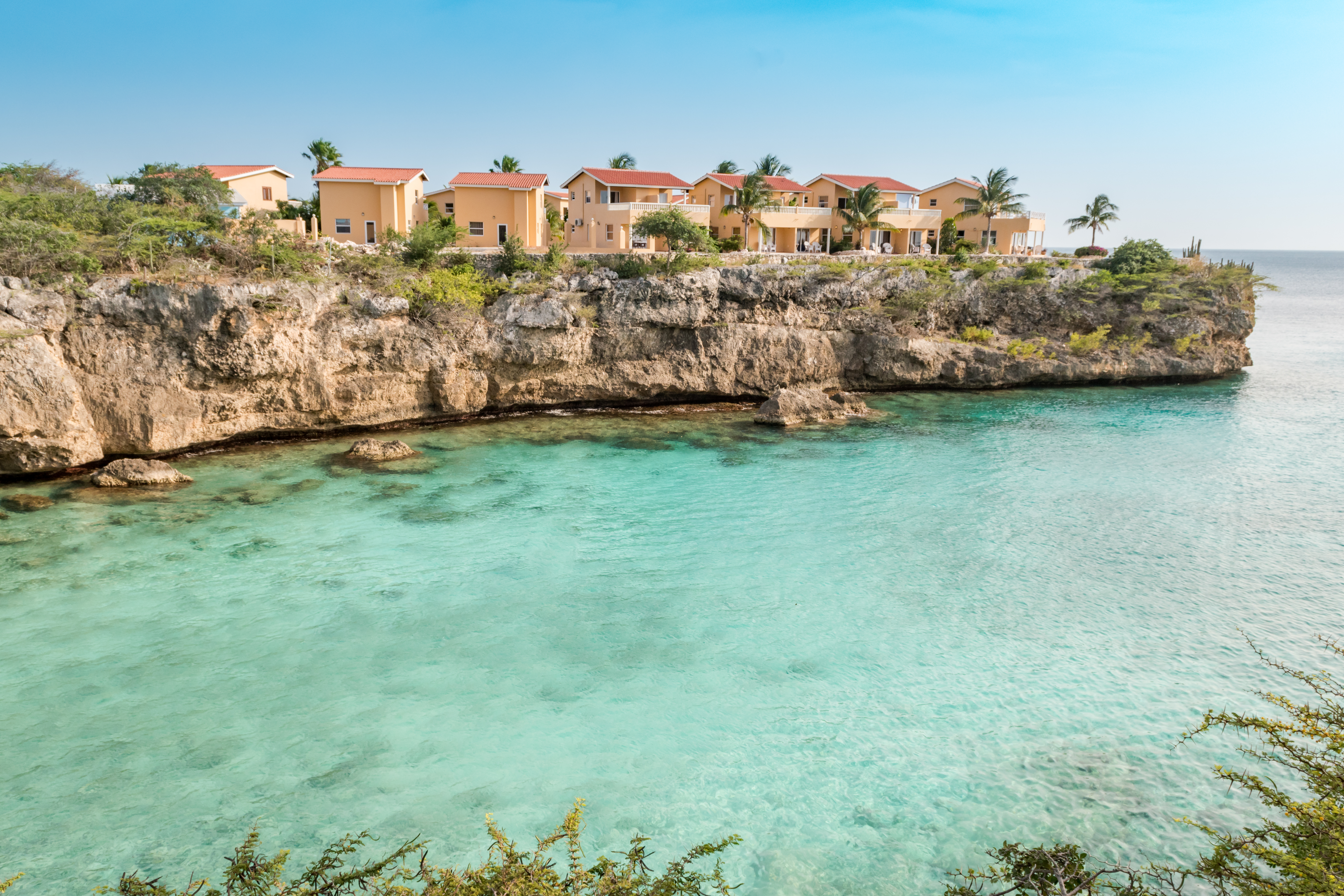

- Location in Curaçao
- Coordinates: 12°19′05″N 69°09′01″W
- Location: Lagún, Curaçao

Playa Lagun is a beach on Curaçao, located near the village of Lagún.

Play Lagun is located in a small bay. Surrounding the bay, an apartment complex has been built. The beach is used as a starting point for snorkeling. There is a snack bar and also a restaurant and dive school.
