= Bandabou =

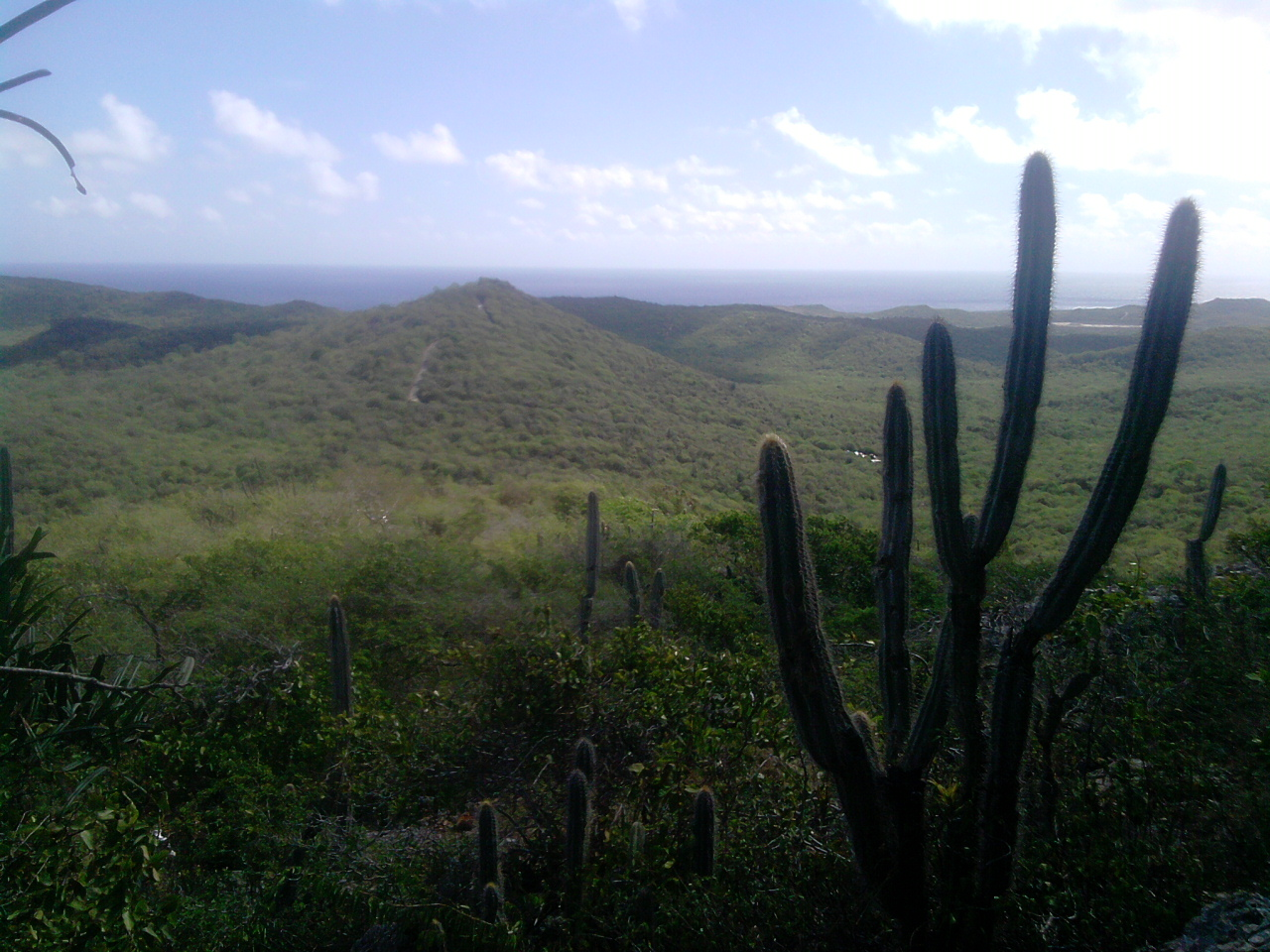
- View of Bandabou from Christoffelberg
- Interactive map of Bandabou
- Coordinates: 12°17′N 069°04′W
- State: Kingdom of the Netherlands
- Country: Curaçao

Population (2011)
  - Total: 13,125
- Climate: BSh

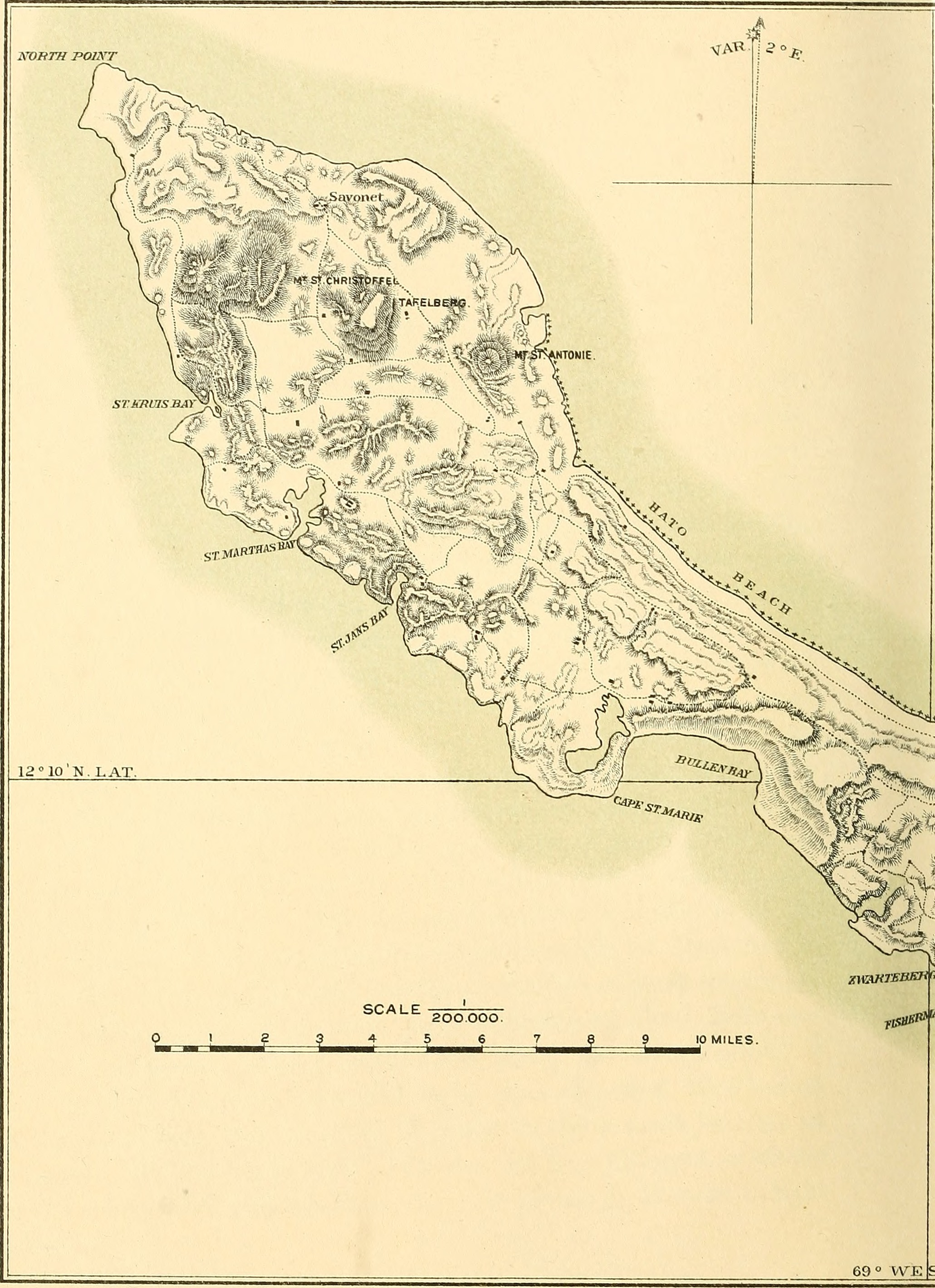
Map of the Bandabou district

Bandabou (also: Band'abou) is a district of the island of Curaçao, a constituent of the Netherlands. It is one of the three districts in the island, and encompasses the north-western parts of the island. The district stretches from Grote Berg to Sabana Westpunt. Bandabou is a Papiamentu word, which translates to "lower side".

== History ==
In 1634, Curaçao was conquered by the Dutch West Indies Company and the city of Punda was founded. Agricultural plantations were established during Dutch colonization to supply Willemstad along with livestock. The plantations were small scale due to the infertile ground, and produced yams, mangos, oranges. In 1795, the population of Bandabou was estimated at 4,000 to 5,000 people most which were slaves. After the emancipation of slavery in 1863, small hamlets were founded in Bandabou. The Roman Catholic church started to build churches in order to educate and convert the slave population, which resulted in several small villages. The current division of the island dates from 1930 when Willemstad was extended to include most of the suburbs.

== Geography ==
Bandabou is one of three districts of the island of Curaçao, a constituent of the Netherlands. It encompasses the north-western parts of the island, stretching from Grote Berg to Sabana Westpunt. Bandabou is written in Papiamentu and translates to "lower side". Bandabou consists of sandy beaches, and natural vegetation. Salt lakes support turtles, fishes, and waterbirds such as flamingoes. It incorporates Christoffelpark, the largest nature park on Curacao, which encompasses the 372 m (1,220 ft) high Christoffelberg, and other protected areas like Shete Boka, which has multiple coves and bays, where the sea turtles lay their eggs during season. West Point is the most northwestern tip of the island.

Bandabou incorporates the villages of Barber, Flip, Lagún, Pannekoek, Sint Willibrordus, Soto, Tera Corá, Tera Pretu, and Sabana Westpunt. Bandabou has poor infrastructure, and suffers from lack of economic opportunities.

== See also ==
- Christoffelpark
- Curaçao Slave Revolt of 1795
- Willemstad
