= Lagún =

- Village
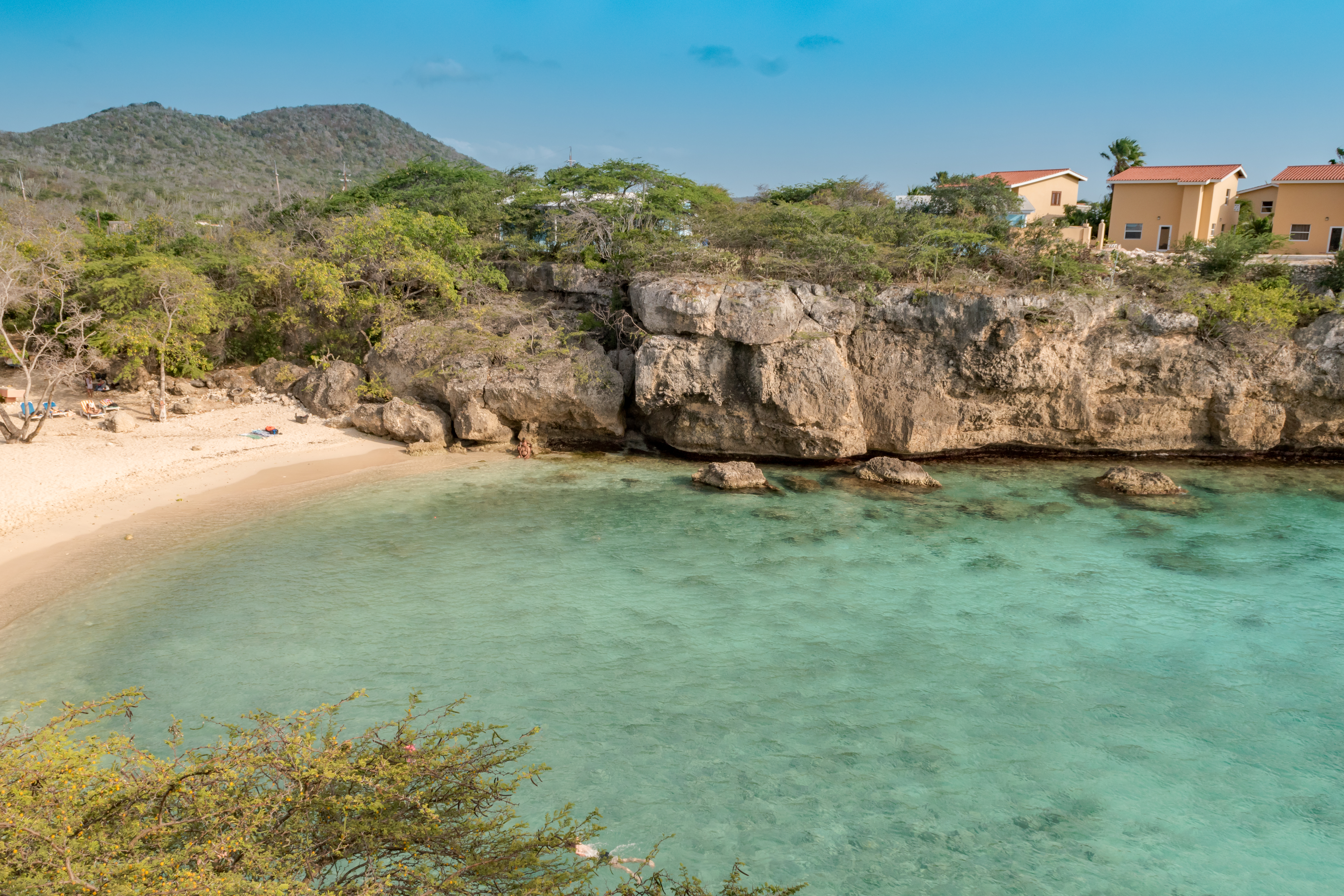
- Beach of Lagun

- Location within Curaçao
- Coordinates: 12°19′N 69°9′W
- State: Kingdom of the Netherlands
- Country: Curaçao
- District: Bandabou

Area
  - Total: 11.65 km^{2} (4.50 sq mi)

Population (2011)
  - Total: 321
  - Density: 27.6/km^{2} (71.4/sq mi)
- Climate: Dfc

Lagún is a village in the Bandabou district of Curaçao. It is located in the north-western part of the country, 30 km northwest of the capital Willemstad. Lagún is a fishing village. Playa Lagun is located south of the village. The Tula Museum is located north of the village.

== History ==
The name is probably related to a hidden lagoon located about 500 metres from the village. The village was founded in the mid-19th century by freed slaves. After the emancipation of 1863, other former slaves joined the villagers. The economy was mainly based on fishing and agriculture.

Lagún is one of the four least populated zones of the island. Between 1992 and 2011, the population decreased by 37% with many emigrating to the Netherlands or moving to the urban area around Willemstad.

== Tula Museum ==
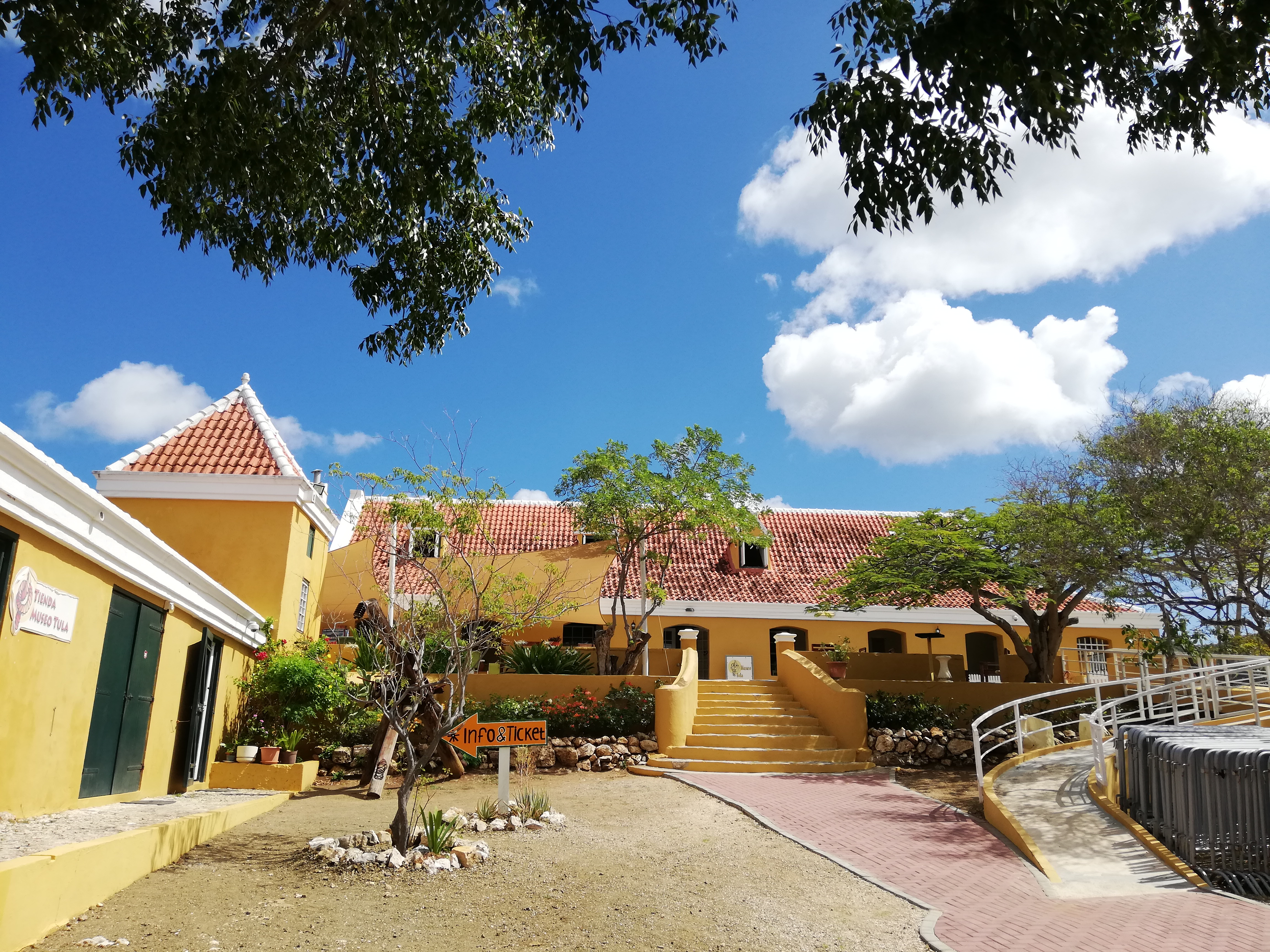
Tula Museum

The Tula Museum is located in the estate of the Plantation Knip. The museum has been named after Tula, a leader of the Curaçao Slave Revolt of 1795. The slave revolt started at the Plantation Knip and lasted almost two months. Tula was captured and executed. The museum tells the story about the life of the slaves, and the revolution of Tula.

The current buildings date from the 1830s, and are in near original condition. Stables, sheds and corrals are located near the estate. The estate has been declared a monument.

== Notable people ==
- Tula (died 1795), slave and rebel leader

== Bibliography ==
- Buurtprofiel Lagun (2011). "Buurtprofiel Lagun" (PDF). Government of Curaçao (in Dutch).
