= Friedrich Samuel Bock =

German philosopher and theologian (1716–1785)

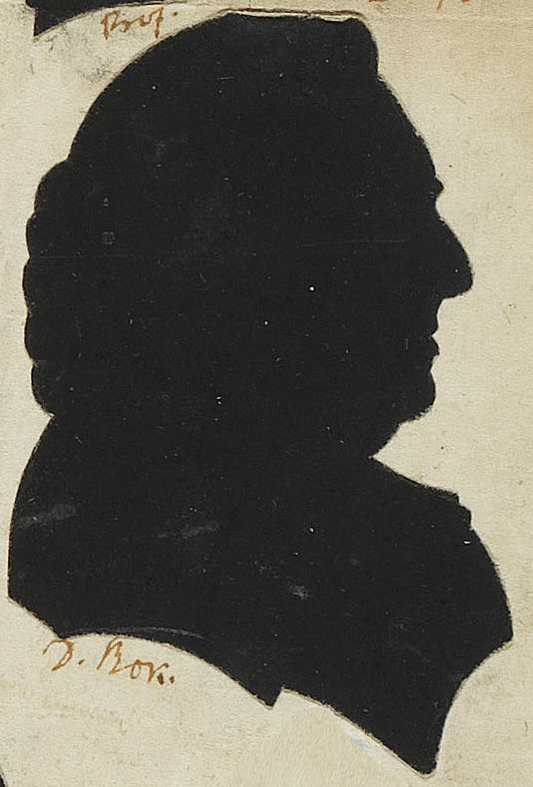
Friedrich Samuel Bock (Silhouette)

Friedrich Samuel Bock (Königsberg 20 May 1716 – Königsberg 30 September 1785) was a German philosopher and theologian.

In 1753 he was appointed first professor of Greek, then theology at the University of Königsberg, though he resigned both positions in 1770 due to the university's failure to pay a salary, plus the onerous duty that the professor of Greek had to lecture on the whole of the New Testament annually.

He retained his previous position as university librarian, in all for twenty-seven years. It was in this position that Bock is associated with Immanuel Kant who was his assistant. At this period the library, or Schloßbibliothek, was situated in two rooms in the castle.

== Works ==
- Historia Antitrinitarianorum 1776. This enlarged work is the sum of a lifetime of interest in the theology of the Socinians. Bock's doctoral dissertation and also inaugural address for his theology position concerned the Polish Brethren. These were initially collected together and published as a history of Antitrinitarians in 1754.
- Lehrbuch der Erziehungskunst, zum Gebrauch für christliche Eltern und künftige Jugendlehrer Königsberg and Leipzig, 1780. Translated as Textbook of the Art of Education for the Use of Christian Parents and Future Teachers of Youth in J. B. Basedow and F.S. Bock on Pedagogy: Translations of Two 18th-Century Textbooks, edited, translated, and annotated by Robert B. Louden, London, New York: Bloomsbury Academic (2025).
