= Maria (rebel leader) =

Maria (died 9 November 1716) was an enslaved Curaçaoan woman and leader of a slave rebellion on Curaçao in the Dutch West Indies in 1716.

Maria was a cook at the plantation St. Maria, owned by the Dutch West India Company, where she prepared the newly captured Africans to be sold into slavery. On 15 September 1716, the enslaved people of the plantation rebelled and killed some of the white staff, including women and children. Within 10 days the rebellion was subdued by the military from Willemstad. Her lover, an enslaved man named Tromp, stated under torture that Maria had planned the rebellion as she wanted revenge on the overseer Muller, who was responsible for the death of her spouse.

Maria was sentenced to death and executed by burning on 9 November 1716.

== Possible wrongful accusation ==
As the only evidence used to tie Maria to the rebellion was an accusation extracted under torture - plus the fact that Maria maintained she was innocent throughout - its quite plausible that she was wrongfully accused. Torture has been proven by several studies to be an unreliable way to extract information.

== In pop culture ==
- Song: Maria of Curaçao - Roseland En Why Cee

== See also ==
- List of slaves
