= Playa Porto Marie =

Beach in Curaçao

- Beach
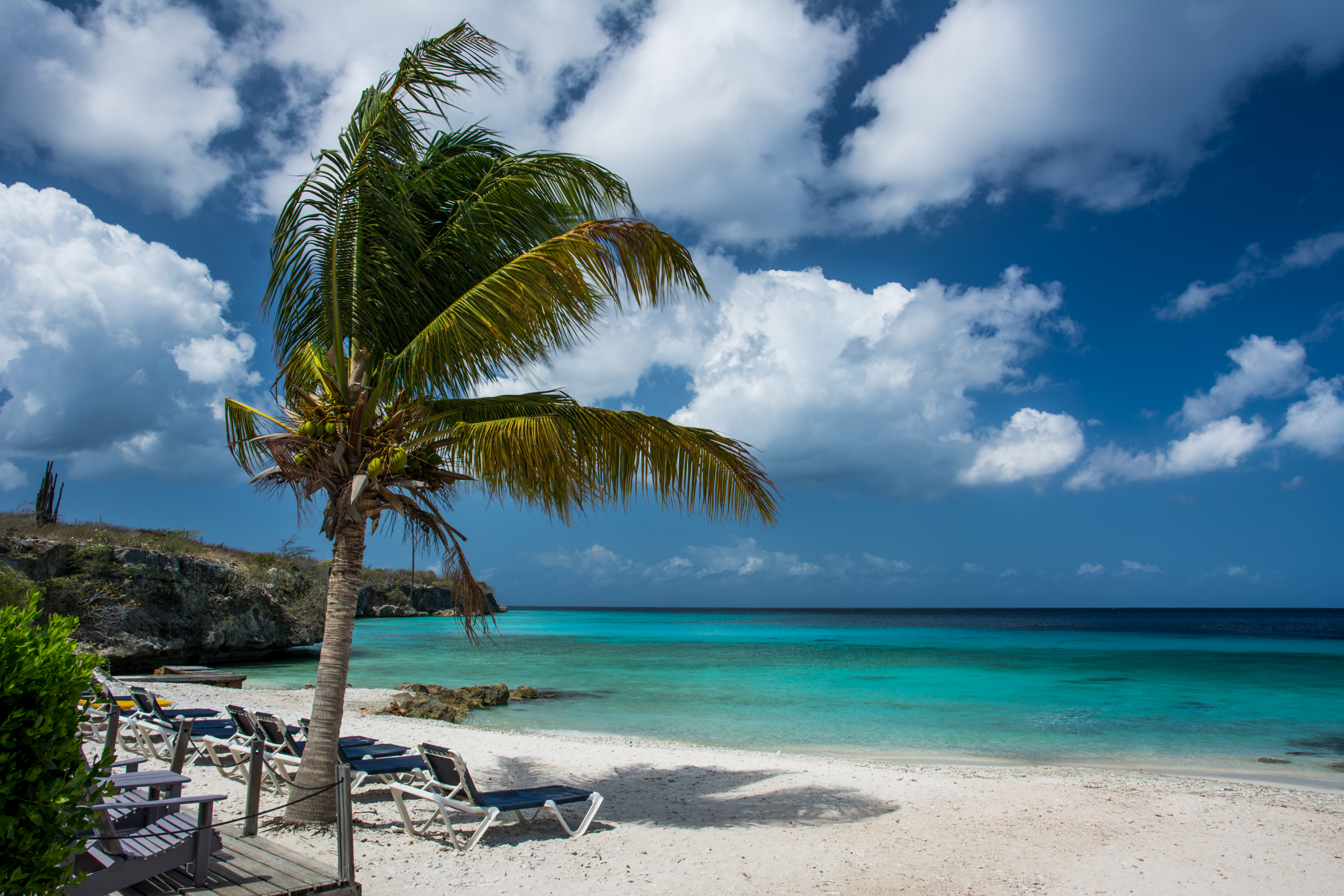
- Playa Porto Marie

- Location in Curaçao
- Coordinates: 12°13′09″N 69°05′11″W
- Location: Sint Willibrordus, Curaçao

Playa Porto Marie (Playa Porto Maria in Papiamento) is a beach on the Caribbean island of Curaçao, located near the village of Sint Willibrordus, at the Porto Marie Bay. The beach is used as a starting point for scuba diving and snorkeling.

Porto Marie Beach is experimenting with artificial coral reefs in order to improve the reef's condition, having placed hundreds of artificial coral blocks.
