= Andrea Spagni =

Life of Spagni

Andrea Spagni (8 August 1716 – 16 September 1788) was an Italian Jesuit theologian, educator, and author who was born at Florence. He entered the Society of Jesus on 22 October 1731, and was employed chiefly in teaching philosophy and theology, though for a time he lectured in mathematics at the Roman College, and assisted Father Asclepi in his astronomical observations. He died in Rome.

== Works ==
The most noted of his writings is the work De Miraculis (Rome, 1777), which he revised in two succeeding editions (Rome, 1779 and 1785). In this work, besides giving the positive doctrine on the nature and reality of miracles, he marshalled together the objections brought forward by the rationalists of his own and preceding times against the chief Biblical miracles. The work may be considered as a compendium of the literature on the subject, up to the last quarter of the eighteenth century.

His other chief works are:

- "De Causa efficiente" (Rome, 1764);
- "De Bono, Malo et Pulchro" (Rome, 1766);
- "De Mundo" (Rome, 1770);
- "De Ideis Mentis humanæ" (Rome, 1772);
- "De Motu" (Rome, 1774);
- "De Anima Brutorum" (Rome, 1775);
- "De Signis Idearum" (Rome, 1781).
