= Dutch West Indies =

Historical collective term for Dutch territories in the Americas

The Dutch West Indies (Dutch: Nederlands-West-Indië) was a collective term for the territories of the Netherlands in the Americas, primarily Suriname and the Dutch territories in the Caribbean. In the 20th century, the term referred to Suriname and the six Dutch Caribbean islands: Aruba, Bonaire, Curaçao, Saba, Sint Eustatius and the Dutch part of Sint Maarten.

Dutch colonial expansion in the region was closely associated with the Dutch West India Company (WIC), established in 1621, which administered several Dutch possessions in the Americas. The territories were commonly regarded collectively as the Dutch "West", in contrast to the Dutch East Indies in Asia, but did not normally constitute a single geographical or administrative entity.

From 1828 to 1845, however, Suriname and the Dutch Caribbean possessions were temporarily united under the Governor-General of the Dutch West Indian possessions, based in Paramaribo. Suriname became independent from the Netherlands in 1975, while the six Caribbean islands remained within the Kingdom of the Netherlands.

== Terminology ==
The term West Indies historically referred to the Caribbean region and was used by several European colonial powers for their possessions there. In Dutch usage, Nederlands-West-Indië became a collective designation for the Dutch possessions in the Americas. The Winkler Prins Encyclopedie defined Nederlands West-Indië in 1947 as the collective name for the Dutch territories in the Americas, comprising Suriname, or Dutch Guiana, and the Netherlands Antilles, while explicitly noting that they formed neither a geographical nor an administrative unit.

The designation was also reflected in contemporary reference works. The Encyclopaedie van Nederlandsch West-Indië, published between 1914 and 1917, covered the remaining Dutch colonies in the West, corresponding to what later became Suriname and the Netherlands Antilles. The collective concept of the Dutch "West" was traditionally contrasted with the Dutch possessions in the East.

== History ==
=== Colonial development ===
Dutch involvement in the Americas expanded substantially following the establishment of the Dutch West India Company in 1621. The company established and administered Dutch possessions in the Caribbean and elsewhere in the Americas. Over time, Dutch colonial rule became concentrated in Suriname and the Caribbean islands of Aruba, Bonaire, Curaçao, Saba, Sint Eustatius and the Dutch part of Sint Maarten.

Although these possessions were collectively regarded as the Dutch "West", they were generally governed separately. Suriname and the Caribbean islands differed geographically, economically and administratively, and the designation Dutch West Indies did not in itself denote a single colony.

Slavery and the transatlantic slave trade formed an important part of the colonial economy in the Dutch West Indian possessions, particularly in Suriname and the Caribbean colonies. Slavery was formally abolished in Suriname and the Dutch Caribbean colonies on 1 July 1863; in Suriname, formerly enslaved people remained subject to state supervision for another ten years.

=== Administrative union, 1828–1845 ===
A significant exception to the generally separate administration of the Dutch West Indian possessions occurred in 1828. That year, Suriname and the Dutch Caribbean possessions were brought under a common administration headed by the Governor-General of the Dutch West Indian possessions. The governor-general resided in Paramaribo and exercised the highest executive authority over the Dutch possessions in the West.

The administration comprised Suriname, Curaçao with its dependent islands Aruba and Bonaire, and the islands of Sint Eustatius, Saba and the Dutch part of Sint Maarten. The surviving administrative records include correspondence between the governor-general and the authorities in the Caribbean possessions and document the government of the combined West Indian territories.

The arrangement proved temporary. In 1845, the governor-generalship was abolished and Suriname was again separated administratively from the Caribbean possessions. The period from 1828 to 1845 was therefore unusual in that the Dutch West Indian possessions, although geographically dispersed, were governed under a single senior colonial authority.

Dutch archival collections preserve records from the broader period under the designation Nederlandse West-Indische Bezittingen ("Dutch West Indian possessions"), including records relating to Suriname and the Netherlands Antilles.

=== Twentieth century and dissolution of the grouping ===
By the early 20th century, Nederlands West-Indië was commonly used for Suriname and the six Dutch Caribbean islands. The Encyclopaedie van Nederlandsch West-Indië of 1914–1917 treated these remaining Dutch territories in the West collectively. Despite this collective terminology, Suriname and the Caribbean possessions continued to have separate administrations.

Following the Dutch constitutional revision of 1948, the Colony of Curaçao and Dependencies became known as the Netherlands Antilles. Under the Charter for the Kingdom of the Netherlands of 1954, Suriname and the Netherlands Antilles became autonomous countries within the Kingdom of the Netherlands.

Suriname became independent on 25 November 1975, ending its constitutional association with the Netherlands. This also ended the historical grouping of Suriname and the Dutch Caribbean territories as parts of a common Dutch "West". Aruba separated from the Netherlands Antilles in 1986 and became a separate constituent country within the Kingdom.

The Netherlands Antilles was dissolved on 10 October 2010. Curaçao and Sint Maarten became constituent countries within the Kingdom, while Bonaire, Sint Eustatius and Saba became public bodies of the Netherlands. The six islands remain part of the Kingdom of the Netherlands under different constitutional arrangements.

== Territories ==
In its later usage, the Dutch West Indies consisted principally of:

- Suriname
- Aruba
- Bonaire
- Curaçao
- Saba
- Sint Eustatius
- Dutch Sint Maarten

The Caribbean islands were later organised as the Colony of Curaçao and Dependencies and subsequently as the Netherlands Antilles, while Suriname remained a separate territory.

== See also ==
- Dutch Caribbean
- Dutch colonial empire
- Dutch colonisation of the Americas
- Dutch colonisation of the Guianas
- Dutch West India Company
- British West Indies
- Danish West Indies
- French West Indies
- Spanish West Indies
- Swedish West Indies
