= Sally Seymour =

American pastry chef

- Died: April 3, 1824
- Occupations: Pastry chef, restaurateur
- Years active: 1795 - 1824
- Known for: Being the matriarch of an African American culinary dynasty in Antebellum Charleston, SC.
- Children: Eliza Seymour Lee, William Seymour

Sally Seymour (died 3 April 1824), was an African American pastry chef and restaurateur. Seymour built up an elite culinary business in Charleston, South Carolina and was one of a few African American business owners at the time. She influenced food styles in Charleston through her restaurant and the numbers of chefs she trained.

== Life ==
Seymour was enslaved by Thomas Martin, who was the father of her children. In the 1780s, Seymour oversaw Martin's house and kitchen. She received training as a pastry chef by Englishman Adam Prior, one of only two French-trained chefs in Charleston.

In 1795, Thomas Martin manumitted her, and she took the name Seymour or Seymore. She established a pastry bakery in Charleston and was able to buy it in 1802. She had several pupils among the free people of color in the city. A formerly enslaved person, she became an enslaver herself and used enslaved labor in her staff: she enslaved between six and nine people in her kitchen at any time between 1805 and 1824. Two of these enslaved people were an African American woman named Chloe, purchased for $400 in 1802, and an African American man named Felix, purchased for $800 in 1814.

The types of food she learned from Adam Prior were cakes, hot meat pies, sweet pies, trifles, jellies and confectionery, her food became more popular than her teachers. Seymour was very successful: in 1817, the St. Cecilia Society held their meeting in her establishment. Thomas Grimké, Charles Cotesworth Pinckney and Thomas Pinckney convened the Mutton Chop Club every fortnight at Seymour's restaurant.

Described as a matriarch of a dynasty of pastry chefs and restaurateurs in Charleston, part of Seymour's legacy was the African American chefs she trained, which included those who were enslaved kitchen workers, free black women, and her children Eliza and William. Some of the people she taught included Camilla Johnson, Eliza Dwight, Martha Gilchrist, Cato McCloud, and the Holton sisters who became rivals of Seymour's business. Seymour's teaching influenced the food of Charleston for vegetables to be cooked in a French style of balanced flavor as highlighted in the cookbook, The Carolina Housewife, by Sarah Rutledge.

She left her business to her daughter Eliza Seymour Lee when she died in 1824, who was also a noted pastry chef. Eliza Lee expanded the business.

== See also ==
- Aspasia Cruvellier Mirault
