= Free people of color =

Persons of partial African and European descent who were not enslaved

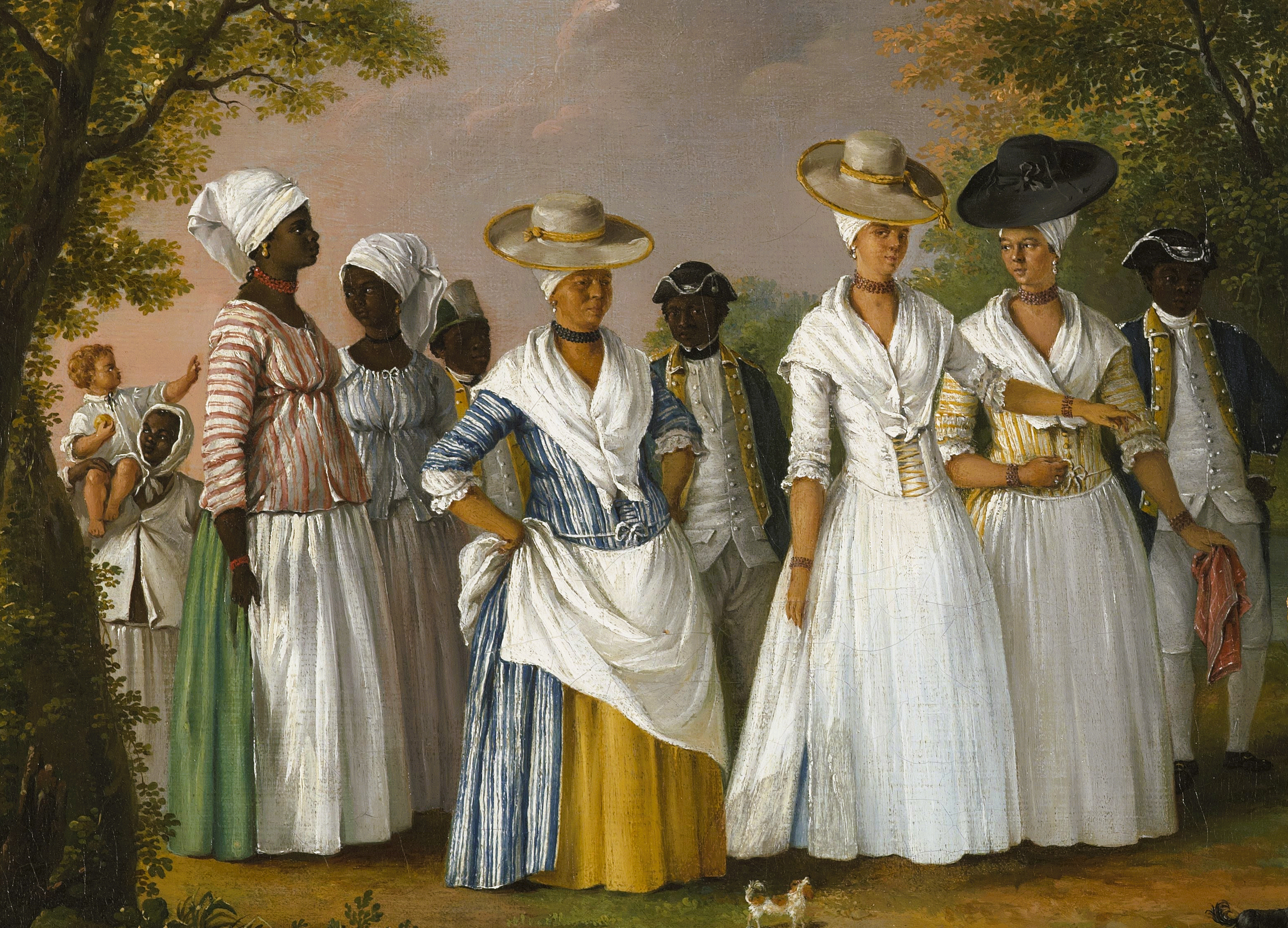
Free Women of Color with their Children and Servants, oil painting by Agostino Brunias, Dominica, c. 1764–1796

Free people of color (French: gens de couleur libres pronounced [ʒɑ̃ də kulœʁ libʁ]; Spanish: gente de color libre) were primarily people of mixed African, European, and Native American descent in the Americas who were not enslaved. However, the term also applied to people born free who were primarily of black African descent with little mixture.

There were distinct groups of free people of color in the French colonies, including Louisiana and in settlements on Caribbean islands, such as Saint-Domingue (Haiti), Saint Lucia, Dominica, Guadeloupe, and Martinique. In these territories and major cities, particularly New Orleans, and those cities held by the Spanish, a substantial third class of primarily mixed-race, free people developed.

These colonial societies classified mixed-race people in a variety of ways, generally related to visible features and to the proportion of African ancestry. Racial classifications were numerous in Latin America.

A freed African slave was known as affranchi (lit. 'freed'). The term was sometimes meant to include the free people of color, but they considered the term pejorative since they had been born free.

The term gens de couleur libres was commonly used in France's West Indian colonies prior to the abolition of slavery. It frequently referred to free people of mixed African and European ancestry.

In British North America, the term free Negro was often used to cover the same class of people—those who were legally free and visibly of African descent.

== Saint-Domingue ==
By the late 18th century prior to the Haitian Revolution, Saint-Domingue was legally divided into three distinct groups: free whites (who were divided socially between the plantation-class grands blancs and the working-class petits blancs); freedmen (affranchis), and slaves. More than half of the affranchis were gens de couleur libres; others were considered freed black people. In addition, maroons (runaway slaves) were sometimes able to establish independent small communities and a kind of freedom in the mountains, along with remnants of Haiti's original Taino people. A large group of surviving Native Tainos also supported the Haitian Revolution; they were known as "indiens esclaves" which numbered about 5,000. In a 1780 census, there was also a group listed as "indiens sauvages", which Haitian historians believe were the native Arawak and Taino that were known to live in tiny reclusive mountain communities at this point.

Jean-Jacques Dessalines, the first ruler of independent Haiti and a leader of the Revolution, talked about people whom he called "Rouges" (reds), or sometimes "Incas" in his letters. When they were spoken about in context of the war, he makes mention of cooperation between Africans and Natives in maroon communities that plotted against colonists on the southern peninsula. He also discusses "Incas among his men" showing him secret burial quarters in the Artibonite valley that could be used by rebels as shelter and storage. There were 3,000 known Native peoples (both "esclaves" and "sauvages") living in Haiti in the years before independence, according to a 1802 colonial census.

Dessalines did not forget these people and their sacrifices against Spain and now, France. He named the Haitian army "the Incas", "the Army of the Sun" and eventually "the Indigenous Army" in honor of them. He also renamed the island "Haiti", its pre-Columbian name.

When slavery was ended in the colony in 1793, by action of the French government following the French Revolution, there were approximately 28,000 anciens libres ("free before") in Saint-Domingue. The term was used to distinguish those who were already free, compared to those liberated by the general emancipation of 1793. About 16,000 of these anciens libres were gens de couleur libres. Another 12,000 were affranchis, black former slaves who had either purchased their freedom or had been given it by their masters for various reasons.

=== Rights ===
Regardless of their ethnicity, in Saint-Domingue freedmen had been able to own land. Some acquired plantations and owned large numbers of slaves themselves. The slaves were generally not friendly with the freedmen, who sometimes portrayed themselves to whites as bulwarks against a slave uprising. As property owners, freedmen tended to support distinct lines set between their own class and that of slaves. Also often working as artisans, shopkeepers or landowners, the gens de couleur frequently became quite prosperous, and many prided themselves on their European culture and descent. They were often well-educated in the French language, and they tended to scorn the Haitian Creole language used by slaves. Most gens de couleur libres were reared as Roman Catholic, also part of French culture, and many denounced the Vodoun religion brought with slaves from Africa.

Under the ancien régime, despite the provisions of equality nominally established in the Code Noir, the gens de couleur were limited in their freedoms. They did not possess the same rights as Frenchmen, specifically the right to vote. Most supported slavery on the island, at least up to the time of the French Revolution. But they sought equal rights for free people of color, which became an early central issue of the unfolding Haitian Revolution.

The primary adversary of the gens de couleur before and into the Haitian Revolution were the working-class white people such as farmers and tradesmen of the colony, known as the petits blancs ("small whites"). Because of the freedmen's relative economic success in the region, sometimes related to blood ties to influential whites people, the petits blancs farmers often resented their social standing and worked to keep them shut out of government. Beyond financial incentives, the free coloreds caused the working-class whites further problems in finding women to start a family. The successful mulattos often won the hands of the small number of eligible women on the island. With growing resentment, the working-class whites monopolized assembly participation and caused the free people of color to look to France for legislative assistance.

Race and class had a unique relationship to one another in Saint-Domingue; class differences meant that there was no singular "free colored class." The statuses varied among gens de couleur and varied by region. In the South Province, unusually high mortality rates and a low number of slaves caused slave owners to prohibit slaves from buying their freedom. Out of 256 manumissions in Cayes, St Louis, and Nippes in the 1760s, "only two were cases in which slaves were described as purchasing themselves." In the North, Stewart King describes "[self-purchase as] a significant source of income for slave owners during bad years." This elaborates on why the southern region's free population of colour was significantly less than that of the North, specifically as little as three percent of all people of African descent in Saint-Domingue. This also led to economic disparities between regions within free colored communities. Wealthy gens de couleur enjoyed the same rights as white farmers, except for the right to vote. This granted them the ability to own land and become landlords and even purchase and brand their own slaves. Their wealth and status also often shielded them from various forms of discrimination due to their connection with the white farmers in Saint-Domingue, though some discrimination still existed. Wealthy gens de couleur are a particularly important group in the context of the Haitian Revolution, as they were the most powerful group of people to fight for independence when the French began stripping away power from the gens of couleur, which served as one of the many catalysts for the Revolution.

Free people of color also had unique methods of achieving upward mobility, usually with a tangible skill or business. Contraband trade with Santo Domingo allowed planters to avoid raising their own meat; on both sides, men of mixed race were prominent in the trade. Free people of color were able to take livestock and keep them for independent butcheries or resell at a profit. This practice was incredibly prominent, and most free people of color raised their own livestock. Free colored people would also find opportunities for growth in other fields. For example, in 1761, the blockades from the Seven Years' War made it difficult to buy European products. Seeing an opportunity for growth, free colored man Philippe paid Louis Verais 3000 livres for a half-share in mulatto slave Joseph, a 35-year-old shoemaker. At 6000 livres, Joseph became three times as valuable as an average male slave through the contract. Other free colored men or slaves found success through saddle-making, a highly respected and lucrative craft; some even used this momentum from saddle-making to become planters. In 1752, a saddle-maker named Julien Delaunay, a free colored man, agreed to pay 300 livres to another man to capture and butcher animals for him. Later, he accumulated enough money to buy a hillside farm for 3000 livres. Even further on, in the 1770s and 1780s, Delaunay was considered a planter more than he was a saddle-maker.

Regarding social mobility, free women of color had a unique opportunity to achieve freedom due to an imbalance in Saint-Domingue's population. Saint-Domingue had relatively few European women; French immigration to the colony was overwhelmingly male. Early on, French men outnumbered women by about four to one or up to six to one. These factors led to female slaves being able to utilize sex to "forge complex relationships with their masters" and receive better odds of freedom. However, sex was not the only way women could achieve social mobility; some also relied on white patrons to help sustain economic independence. Such can be seen with Marie Bety, who relied on "Jean Maignan, the white former militia commander of the Nippes district," who served as a banker for Bety from 1749 to 1760. Maignan would often disburse money that Bety spent, such as a kerchief, linen, and striped muslin she purchased from a merchant named Tolet. Bety used Maignan's continued patronage to assert authority over the white men she employed. "It was through him that she paid a white man to guard her property, a doctor to treat a slave, and a bailiff to serve papers on a white planter." Women also had higher manumission rates, granting them earlier access to capital ownership, thus leading to free women of color often dominating free men of color in Saint-Domingue's economy.

=== French citizenship ===
The free people of color won a major political battle on May 15, 1791, when the Constituent Assembly in France voted to give full French citizenship to them, on the condition of having two free parents. The decree was revoked on September 24, 1791, and replaced by a new, more generous decree on April 4, 1792, that gave full French citizenship to all free people, regardless of the color of their skin and the statuses of their parents. This was followed by a proclamation on February 4, 1794, which abolished slavery in French colonies, granting citizenship rights to all, regardless of color.

=== Struggle ===
In their competition for power, both the poor whites and free coloreds enlisted the help of slaves. By doing this, the feud helped to disintegrate class discipline and propel the slave population in the colony to seek further inclusion and liberties in society. As the widespread slave rebellion in the north of the island wore on, many free people of color abandoned their earlier distance from the slaves. A growing coalition between the free coloreds and the former slaves was essential for the eventual success of the Haitians to expel French influence.

The former slaves and the anciens libres still remained segregated in many respects. Their animosity and struggle for power erupted in 1799. The competition between the gens de couleur led by André Rigaud and the black Haitians led by Toussaint Louverture devolved into the War of the Knives.

After their loss in that conflict, many wealthy gens de couleur left as refugees to France, Cuba, Puerto Rico, the United States and elsewhere. Some took slaves with them. Others, however, remained to play an influential role in Haitian politics.

== Caribbean ==
Free people of color were an important part generally in the history of the Caribbean during the period of slavery and afterward. Initially descendants of French men and African and Indian slaves (and later French men and free women of color), and often marrying within their own mixed-race community, some achieved wealth and power. By the late eighteenth century, most free people of color in Saint-Domingue were native born and part of colored families that had been free for generations.

Free people of color were leaders in the French colony of Saint-Domingue, which achieved independence in 1804 as the Republic of Haiti. In Saint-Domingue, Martinique, Guadeloupe, and other French Caribbean colonies before slavery was abolished, the free people of color were known as gens de couleur libres, and affranchis. Comparable mixed-race groups became an important part of the populations of the British colony of Jamaica, the Spanish colonies of Santo Domingo, Cuba, Puerto Rico, the Dutch colony of Suriname and the Portuguese colony of Brazil.

== New Orleans and New France ==
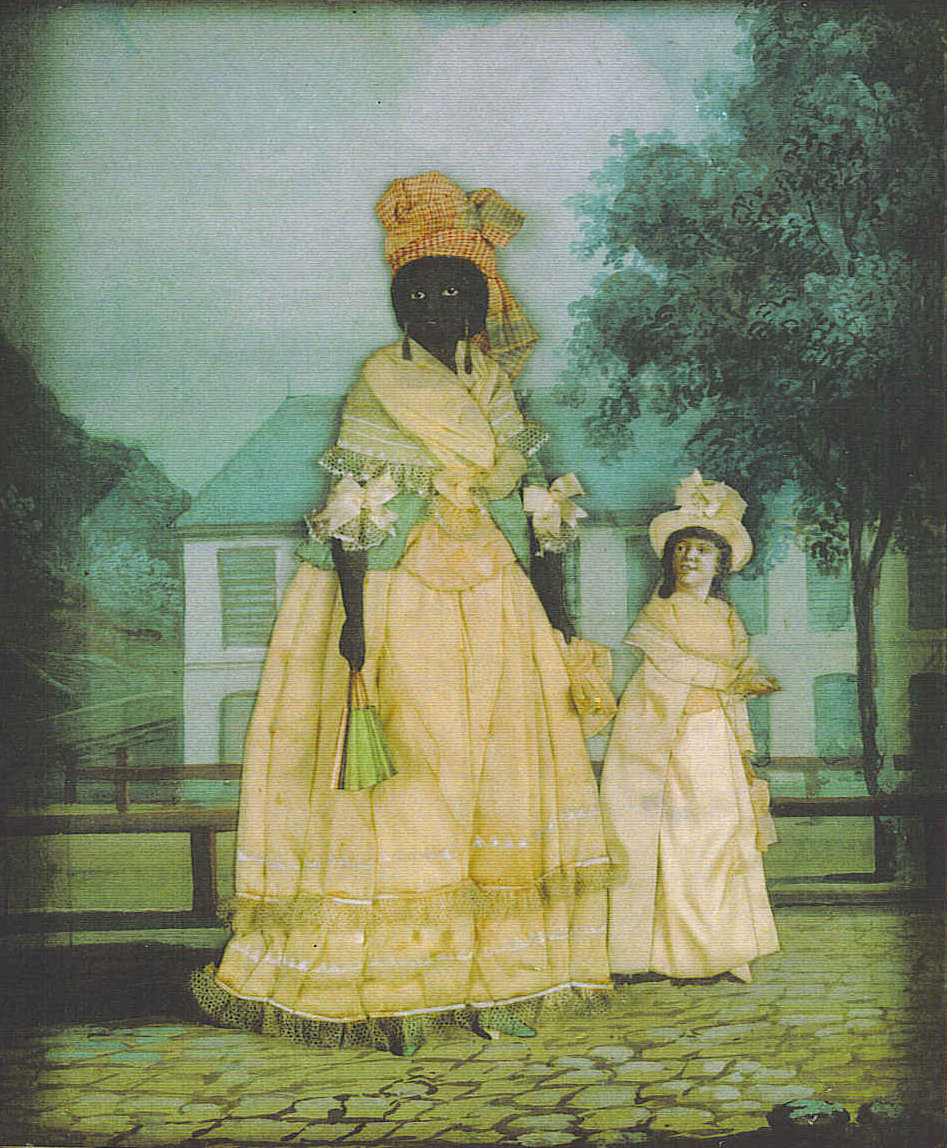
Free woman of color with quadroon daughter. Late 18th-century collage painting, New Orleans.

Free people of color played an important role in the history of New Orleans and the southern area of New France, both when the area was controlled by the French and Spanish, and after its acquisition by the United States as part of the Louisiana Purchase.

When French settlers and traders first arrived in these colonies, the men frequently took Native American women as their concubines or common-law wives (see Marriage 'à la façon du pays'). When African slaves were imported to the colony, many colonists took African women as concubines or wives. In the colonial period of French and Spanish rule, men tended to marry later after becoming financially established. Later, when more white families had settled or developed here, some young French men or ethnic French Creoles still took mixed-race women as mistresses, often known as placées.

Popular stereotypes portray such unions as formal, financial transactions arranged between a white man and the mother of the mixed-race mistress. Supposedly, the young woman of mixed European and African ancestry would attend dances known as "quadroon balls" to meet white gentlemen willing to provide for her and any children she bears from their union. The relationship would end as soon as the man married properly. According to legend, free girls of color were raised by their mothers to become concubines for white men, as they themselves once were.

However, evidence suggests that on account of the community's piety by the late 18th century, free women of color usually preferred the legitimacy of marriage with other free men of color. In cases where free women of color did enter extramarital relationships with white men, such unions were overwhelmingly lifelong and exclusive. Many of these white men remained legal bachelors for life. This form of interracial cohabitation was often viewed as no different from the modern conception of a common-law marriage.

As in Saint-Domingue, the free people of color developed as a separate class between the colonial French and Spanish and the mass of black slaves. They often achieved education, practiced artisan trades, and gained some measure of wealth; they spoke French and practiced Catholicism. Many also developed a syncretic Christianity. At one time the center of their residential community in New Orleans was the French Quarter. Many were artisans who owned property and their own businesses. They formed a social category distinct from both whites and slaves, and maintained their own society into the period after United States annexation.

Some historians suggest that free people of color made New Orleans the cradle of the civil rights movement in the United States. They achieved more rights than did free people of color or free blacks in the Thirteen Colonies, including serving in the armed militia. After the United States acquired the Louisiana Territory, Creoles in New Orleans and the region worked to integrate the military en masse. William C. C. Claiborne, appointed by Thomas Jefferson as governor of the Territory of Orleans, formally accepted delivery of the French colony on December 20, 1803.

== Military service ==
Free men of color had been armed members of the militia for decades during both Spanish and French rule of the colony of Louisiana. They volunteered their services and pledged their loyalty to Claiborne and to their newly adopted country. In early 1804, the new U.S. administration in New Orleans under Governor Claiborne was faced with a dilemma previously unknown in the United States, the integration of the military by incorporating entire units of established "colored" militia. See, e.g., the February 20, 1804 letter from Secretary of War Henry Dearborn to Claiborne, stating that "it would be prudent not to increase the Corps, but to diminish, if it could be done without giving offense."

A decade later during the War of 1812, the militia which consisted of free men of color volunteered to join the force mustered by Andrew Jackson in preparation for the Battle of New Orleans, when the British began landing troops outside the city in December 1814 in preparation for an invasion of the city. The battle resulted in a decisive American victory, in which black soldiers played a critical role. However, many black troops who had been promised freedom in exchange for service were forcibly returned to slavery after the battle's conclusion.

== Definition ==
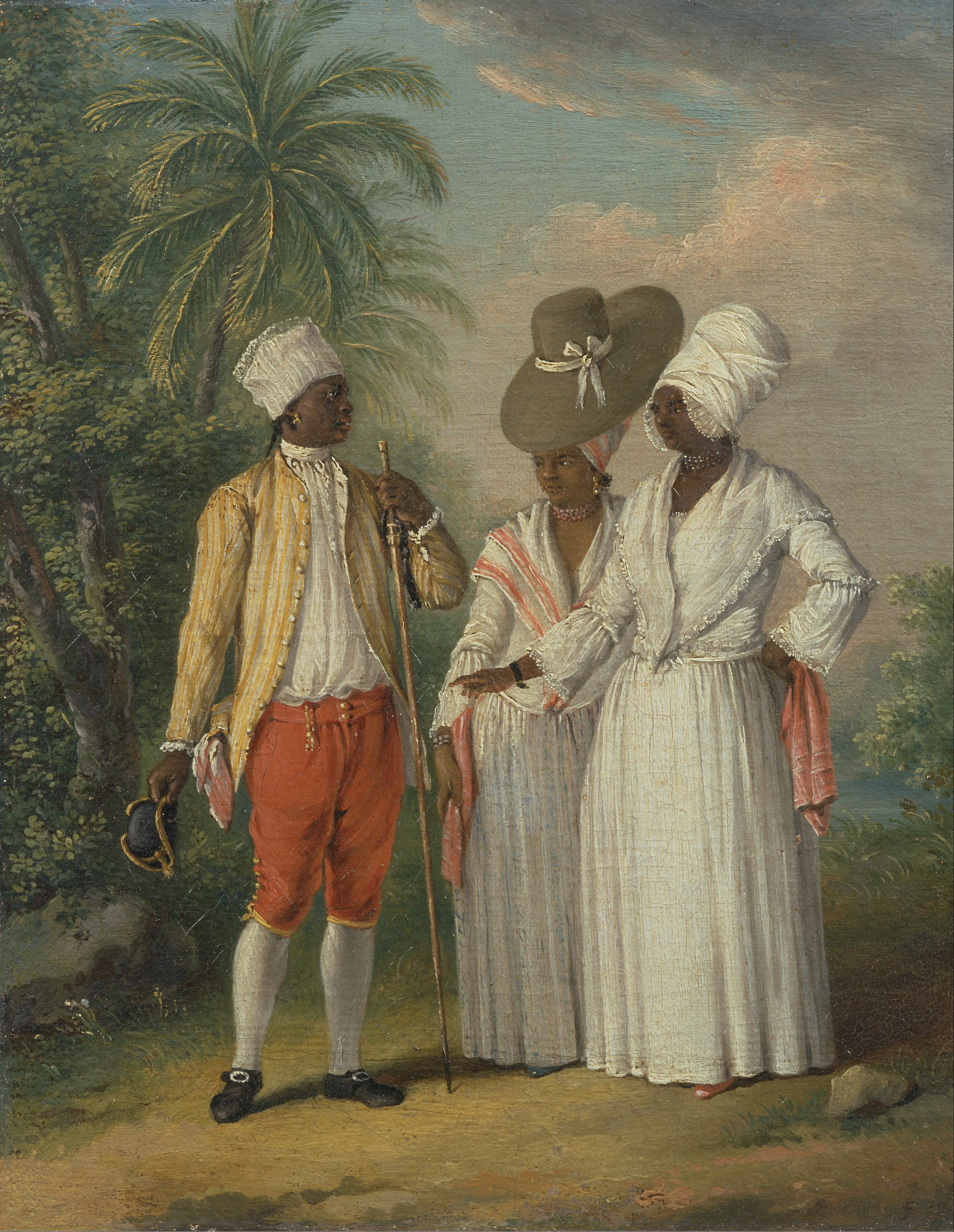
Free West Indian Dominicans, c. 1770

There was relatively little manumission of slaves until after the revolution. Throughout the slave societies of the Americas, some slave owners took advantage of the power relationships to use female slaves sexually; sometimes they had extended relationships of concubinage. However, in the Thirteen Colonies, the children of these relationships were not usually emancipated.

South Carolina diarist Mary Chesnut wrote in the mid-19th century that "like the patriarchs of old our men live all in one house with their wives and their concubines, and the mulattos one sees in every family exactly resemble the white children ..." In some places, especially in the French and Spanish Caribbean and South American slave societies, the ethnic European father might acknowledge the relationship and his children. Some were common-law marriages of affection. Slaveholders were more likely to free their mixed-race children of these relationships than they were to free other slaves. They also sometimes freed the enslaved women who were their concubines.

Many slave societies allowed masters to free their slaves. As the population of color became larger and the white ruling class felt more threatened by potential instability, they worked through their governments to increase restrictions on manumissions. These usually included taxes, requirements that some socially useful reason be cited for manumission, and a requirement that a newly freed person demonstrate a means of independent support. Masters might free their slaves for a variety of reasons, but the most common was a family relationship between master and slave.

Slaves sometimes gained a measure of freedom by purchasing themselves, when allowed to save some portion of earnings if leased out or selling produce. The master determined if one had to pay market or reduced value. In other cases, relatives who were already free and earning money purchased others. Sometimes masters, or the government, would free slaves without payment as a reward for some notable service; a slave who revealed slave conspiracies for uprisings was sometimes rewarded with freedom.

Many people who lived as free within the slave societies did not have formal liberty papers. In some cases, these were refugees, who hid in the towns among free people of color and tried to maintain a low profile. In other cases, they were "living as free" with the permission of their master, sometimes in return for payment of rent or a share of money they earned by trades. The master never made their freedom official, as in the case of Margaret Morgan, who had been living as a free person in Pennsylvania but was captured in 1837 and sold together with her children under claims that they were still slaves according to the laws of Maryland.

== Economic influence ==
Free people of color filled an important niche in the economy of slave societies. In most places they worked as artisans and small retail merchants in the towns. In many places, especially in the American South, there were restrictions on people of color owning slaves and agricultural land. But many free blacks lived in the countryside, and some became major slaveholders. In the antebellum years, individual slaves who were freed often stayed on or near the plantations where they or their ancestors had been slaves, and where they had extended family. Masters often used free blacks as plantation managers or overseers, especially if the master had a family relationship with a mixed-race man.

In the early 19th century, societies required apprenticeships for free blacks to ensure they developed a means of support. For instance, by the late 1830s North Carolina county courts could apprentice orphans, fatherless or abandoned children, illegitimate children, and free black children whose parents were not employed.

However, the number of apprenticeships declined as the number of free blacks increased. In some Southern states after the Nat Turner slave rebellion of 1831, the legislatures passed laws that forbade the teaching of free blacks or slaves to read and write, which was a requirement for having an apprenticeship. There was fear if blacks could read and write, they might start slave revolts and rebellions. Blacks were not allowed to apprentice as an editor or work in a printing press. Despite the restrictions of some apprenticeships, many free blacks benefited from their time as an apprentice.

In Caribbean colonies, governments sometimes hired free people of color as rural police to hunt down runaway slaves and keep order among the slave population. From the view of the white enslaver class in places such as Saint-Domingue or Jamaica, this was a critical function in a society in which the population of slaves on large plantations vastly outnumbered whites.

In places where law or social custom permitted it, some free people of color managed to acquire good agricultural land and slaves and become planters themselves. Free blacks owned plantations in almost all the slave societies of the Americas. In the United States, free people of color may have owned the most property in Louisiana, as France and Spain had allowed the territory's Creole residents more recognition of mixed-race children before its acquisition by the United States. A man who had a relationship with a woman of color often also arranged for a transfer of wealth to her and their children, whether through deed of land and property to the mother and/or children under the system of plaçage, or by arranging for an apprenticeship to a trade for their mixed-race children, which provided them a better opportunity to make a skilled living, or by educating sons in France and easing their way into the military. In St. Domingue by the late colonial period, gens de couleur owned about one-third of the land and about one-quarter of the slaves, mostly in the southern part of the island.

== Post-slavery ==
When the end of slavery came, the distinction between former free coloreds and former slaves persisted in some societies. Because of advantages in the social capital of education and experience, free people of color often became leaders for the newly freed people. In Saint-Domingue, Toussaint Louverture had gained freedom before he became a leader in the slave rebellion, but he is not believed to have been of mixed race.

In the United States, many of the African Americans elected as state and local officials during Reconstruction in the South had been free in the South before the Civil War. Other new leaders were educated men of color from the North whose families had long been free and who went to the South to work and help the freedmen. Some were elected to office.

== Today ==
Many descendants of the gens de couleur, or free people of color, of the Louisiana area celebrate their culture and heritage through a New Orleans–based Louisiana Creole Research Association (LA Créole). The term "Créole" is not synonymous with "free people of color" or gens de couleur libre, but many members of LA Créole have traced their genealogies through those lines. Today, the (often multiracial) descendants of the French and Spanish colonists, Africans, and other ethnicities are widely known as Louisiana Creoles. Louisiana's Governor Bobby Jindal signed Act 276 on 14 June 2013, creating the "prestige" license plate, "I'm Creole", honoring Louisiana Creoles' contributions and heritage.

The terms Louisiana "Créole" and "Cajun" have sometimes been confused, as members of each group generally had ancestors who were French-speaking; but the terms are not synonymous. The Cajuns often have some ancestry tracing back to French colonists who were expelled from Acadia (in eastern Canada) and resettled in Louisiana in the 18th century, generally outside the New Orleans area. Generations later, some of their culture relates to that of the Louisiana Creoles, but they are distinct. Members of each group may be multi-ethnic.

== Notable people ==
- Francis Williams (poet) (c. 1700–1770), Jamaican poet and school teacher
- Elisabeth Samson (1715-1771), Surinamese free-born coffee plantation owner
- Mariana Franko (1718 - after 1779), free colored in Curaçao in the Dutch West Indies. She successfully challenged the Curaçao authorities in a famous court case.
- Mary Johnston Rose or Mary Rose (1718–1783), Jamaican Free person of color and hotelier on Jamaica
- Anne Rossignol (1730–1810), African, Caribbean and American slave trader, referred to as the first free colored voluntary immigrant to the United States
- Barzillai Lew (1743–1822), born free, served in the Continental Army
- Julien Raimond (1744–1801), leader from Saint-Domingue of the campaign in France and the colony to extend full citizenship to free men of color following the French Revolution
- Chevalier de Saint-Georges (1745–1799), composer and swordsman in late 18th-century France
- Salem Poor (1747–1802), born a slave; purchased his freedom and joined the Continental Army
- Peter Salem (1750–1816), born a slave in Massachusetts; freed by his master to fight for the Patriot cause in the American Revolutionary War
- Vincent Ogé (1755–1791) was a wealthy free man of mixed-race descent who instigated a revolt against white colonial authority in French Saint-Domingue.
- André Rigaud (1761–1811) was the leading mulatto military leader during the Haitian Revolution.
- Thomas-Alexandre Dumas (1762–1806), father of French writer Alexandre Dumas (author of The Three Musketeers), was the son of a noble French general in Saint Domingue and a slave woman. His father took him to France at age 14 and gave him an education, helping him enter the military
- John Chavis, (с. 1763 – 1838), born free in North Carolina, a teacher and preacher among both white and free people of color until the mid-19th century, when laws restricted free people of color
- Sablika (fl. 1795), a Curaçao resistance fighter and associate of Tula, the leader of the Curaçao Slave Revolt of 1795.
- Alexandre Pétion (1770–1818), President of the Republic of Haiti from 1807 until his death in 1818.
- Jean-Louis Dolliole (1779–1861), architect-builder in New Orleans, Louisiana.
- William Costin (c. 1780 – 1842), born in Fairfax County, Virginia; lived in Washington, D.C.; in 1821 brought legal challenge to African surety bond laws.
- Zabeau Bellanton (fl. 1782), businesswoman of Saint-Domingue and one of the richest free people of color in the colony
- William Ellison (c. 1790 – 1861), born a slave; became a wealthy businessman and slaveholder
- Richard Hill (Jamaica) (1795–1872), Jamaican lawyer, naturalist, politician, educator and administrator
- Joaquina Lapinha (before 1786 – after 1811), Afro-Brazilian opera singer, first Afro-American woman to perform in Portugal
- Louis Celeste Lecesne (1796/1798 – 1847), campaigner for equal rights for free people of color in Jamaica
- Elisabeth Dieudonné Vincent (1798–1883) Haitian-born free woman of color and businesswoman
- Edward Jordon (1800–1869), Jamaican campaigner for equal rights, newspaper editor, mayor of Kingston
- Aspasia Cruvellier Mirault (1800–1857), American entrepreneur
- Eliza Seymour Lee (1800–1874), American pastry chef and restaurateur
- Robert Osborn (Jamaica) (1800–1878), co-founder of The Watchman with Jordon, politician, campaigner for equal rights
- Marie Laveau (1801–1881), early 19th-century Voodoo practitioner
- Thomas Day (1801–1861), born free in Virginia, furniture maker/craftsman in Caswell County, North Carolina
- Mary Seacole (1805–1881), Jamaican nurse who served in the Crimean War
- Norbert Rillieux (1806–1894), American-French engineer and inventor
- William Gustavus Brown (1809–1883), Jamaican-born general, who commanded British forces in China and Hong Kong
- Robert Purvis (1810–1898), born free in Charleston, became active abolitionist in Philadelphia, supported the Underground Railroad and used inherited wealth to create services for African Americans
- Charles Henry Langston (1817–1892), abolitionist and activist in Ohio and Kansas
- George William Gordon (1820–1865), Jamaican politician and campaigner for the rights of black people
- Louis Lucien Pessou (1824–1886), Louisiana-born Saint-Domingue Creole printmaker in New Orleans
- Edmond Dédé (1827–1901), Louisiana-born French composer
- Maria Vlier (1828–1908), Surinamese teacher who wrote the first history textbook of Suriname
- John Mercer Langston (1829–1897), abolitionist, politician and activist in Ohio, Washington, DC; and Virginia, first dean of Howard University Law Department, first president of Virginia State Univ., first black elected to US Congress from Virginia (1888)
- Jennie Carter (c. 1830 – 1881), American writer
- Cubah Cornwallis (d. 1848), Jamaican "doctress", who nursed Horatio Nelson, 1st Viscount Nelson back to health
- Amanda America Dickson (1849–1893), 19th-century heiress through her white father, socialite and estate owner in Georgia
- Jan Ernst Matzeliger (1852-1889), Surinamese inventor, who moved to the United States to invent the automated lasting machine, significantly changing shoe-manufacturing.
- Penelope Steel (c. 1768 – c. 1840), a Jamaican-born merchant, publisher, and cartographer active in London during the early 19th century.

== See also ==
- Black elite
- Coloureds
- Creoles of color
- Free Negro
- Mauritian Creoles
- Mulatto Haitian
- Signare

== Works cited ==
=== Books ===
- Heinegg, Paul (2021). Free African Americans of North Carolina, Virginia, and South Carolina from the Colonial Period to About 1820. Sixth Edition. Vol. I - Families Abel to Drew. Baltimore, MD: Genealogical Publishing Company. ISBN 9780806359298.
- Hashaw, Tim (2006). Children of Perdition. Melungeons and the Struggle of Mixed America. Macon, GA: Mercer University Press. ISBN 9780881460742.
- Price, Edward Thomas (January 1950). Mixed Blood Populations of Eastern United States as to origins, localizations, and persistence. Oakland, CA: University of California.

== Representation in other media ==
- The Feast of All Saints is a historical novel by Anne Rice, focusing on the gens de couleur libres in New Orleans. The novel was adapted as a TV mini-series of the same name.
- The Benjamin January mysteries is a series of historical murder mystery novels by Barbara Hambly set in and around New Orleans whose main character, the eponymous Benjamin January, is a free man of color.
