= Anna McClarmonde Chase =

American spy (1809–1874)

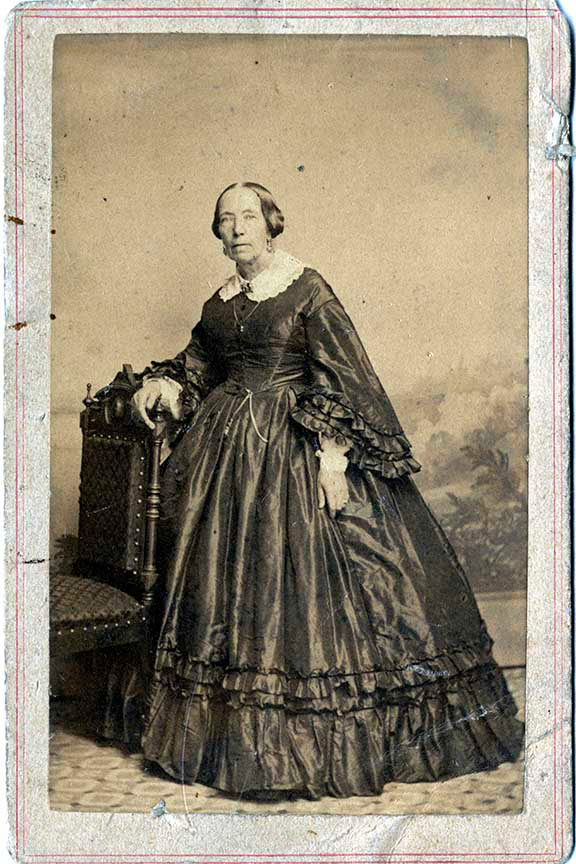
- Born: Anna McClarmonde; 1809; Ireland
- Died: December 24, 1874 (aged 64–65); Brooklyn, New York
- Other name: Ann Chase
- Occupation: Merchant
- Known for: Spying during the Mexican–American War

Anna McClarmonde Chase (also Ann Chase; 1809 – 1874) was an American merchant and spy for the United States during the Mexican–American War. Born in Ireland, she emigrated to the U.S. in 1824. She spent time in Philadelphia and New Orleans before settling in Tampico, Mexico, where she was a merchant and lived with her husband, the U.S. consul to Mexico. During the war, she spied on troop movements, spread disinformation and relayed information to the U.S. Navy. Her information led to the capture of Tampico and she gained the nickname "Heroine of Tampico".

== Early life ==
Anna McClarmonde was born in 1809 in Ireland. Her father died in 1818 and her family immigrated to the United States in 1824. Her mother died a year after their arrival and Anna went to live with her brother in Philadelphia. She helped him manage his business and they both moved to New Orleans in 1834.

She moved to the port city of Tampico, in the Mexican state of Tamaulipas, in 1836. She met Franklin Chase, a U.S. consul in Mexico, and the pair married in 1838. In Tampico, Chase and her husband were successful merchants. She was a full partner alongside her husband in their firm, named F&A Chase. The "castle-like mansion" they lived in doubled as the customs house for Tampico. In the early 1840s, Chase nursed U.S. writer Benjamin Moore Norman back to health after he contracted malaria. She also presented him with three Huastec sculptures that were later given to the New York Historical Society.

== Mexican–American War ==
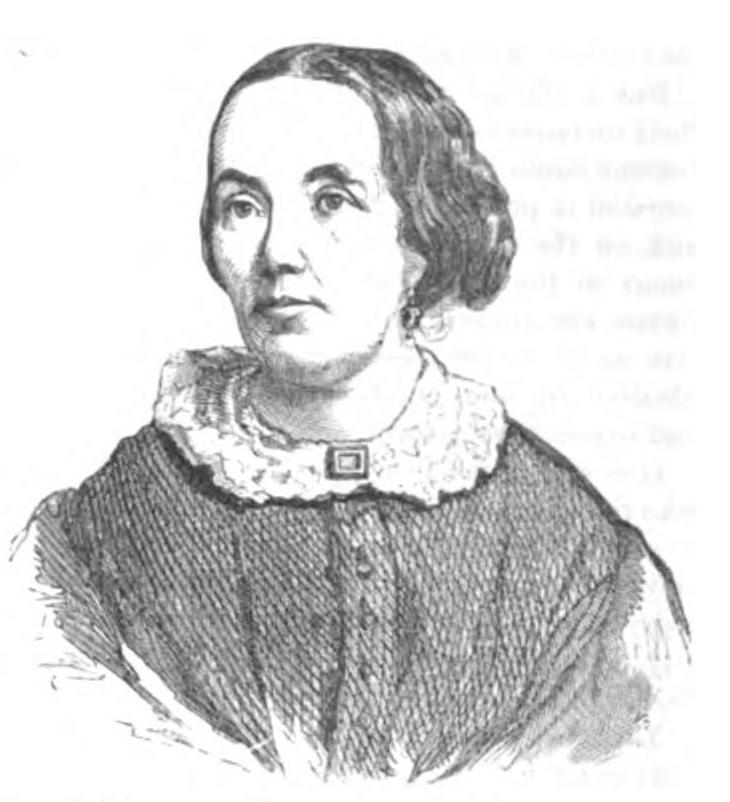
Sketch of Chase

At the start of the Mexican–American War in 1846, citizens of the United States were ordered to evacuate Tampico. Franklin Chase signed his property over to Anna to prevent its confiscation by Mexican authorities. He left Tampico in June of that year and she stayed to manage the business, exempt from the evacuation order due to her status as a subject of the United Kingdom. Chase spied on troop movements and collected information on the defenses of the city which she passed along to the United States Navy via British sailors.

Chase also provided disinformation about U.S. troop strength. Possibly upon learning of Chase's troop estimates, the withdrawal from Tampico of Mexican defense forces was ordered by Antonio López de Santa Anna. Anastasio Parrodi led his troops out of the city in late October 1846. U.S. Navy commodore David Conner, who led the Home Squadron during the war, did not sail for Tampico until after receiving a communiqué from Chase in early November informing him of the withdrawal of the defense forces. Tampico was captured on November 14, 1846. After learning that the U.S. forces had arrived in Tampico, Chase hoisted a U.S. flag over her house. The fortifications of the invading forces were named Fort Ann, after her. For her deeds, she became known as the "Heroine of Tampico".

== Death ==
Chase died of cancer on December 24, 1874, in Brooklyn, New York. The University of Texas at Arlington holds the Chase Family Papers in its Special Collections.
