= Annina Zamperini =

Italian opera singer

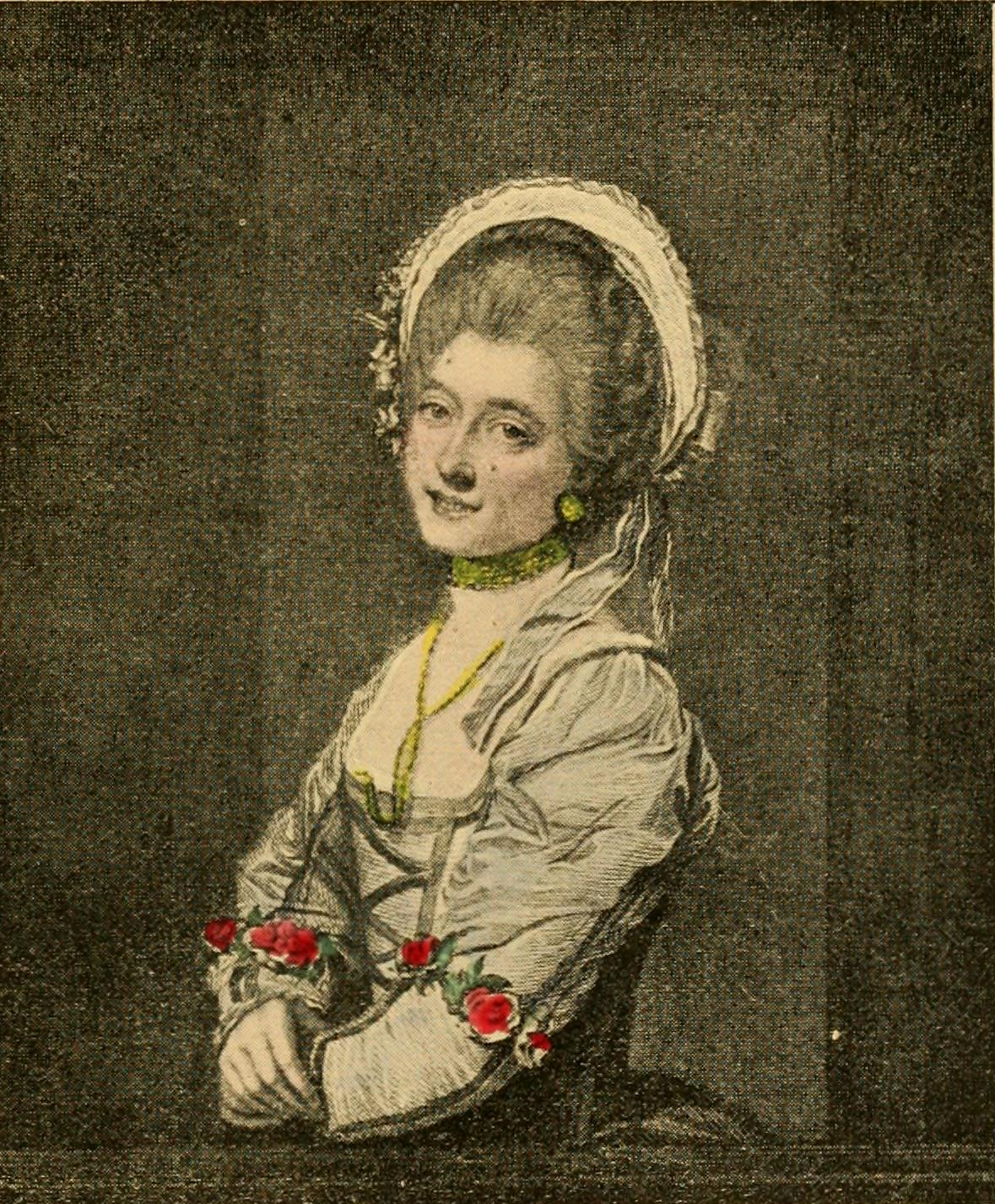
Signora Zamperini

Anna "Annina" Zamperini, sometimes given as Anna Zamperini, "Annina" being a diminutive form of Anna (c. 1745- fl. 1776) was an Italian soprano who performed in European opera houses during the latter half of the eighteenth century.

== Life ==
She was born in Venice. Her sister Antonia Zamperini was also an opera singer. She married the singer Giandomenico Zamperini. During her later London engagement, the singers Anna Maria Zamperini and Antonia Zamperini were also engaged at the same company with her and her spouse, but it is unknown if they were her sisters or her daughters.

She was engaged in Venice Opera in 1761-1766. There she created the role of Flaminia in Pietro Alessandro Guglielmi's La spirito dicontradizione in 1766.

She was engaged at the King's Theatre in London in 1766-1770, where she enjoyed a successful career as a primadonna. She was one of the principle singers of the opera company. Silas Neville called her "the best of the company" and Charles Burney described her as "a very pretty woman, but an affected singer". She also performed as a dancer.

She was said at the time to have a relationship with director George Hobart, and her relationship with Lord March was mentioned in letters of the time. She is briefly noted to have had a short affair with Prince Henry, Duke of Cumberland.

After her London engagement, she returned to Venice.

Between 1772 and 1774, she was engaged at the Teatro da Rua dos Condes in Lisbon. She was the star of the opera and widely celebrated. The combination of her extremely high salary and the scandal caused by her reputed love affairs resulted in Anna Zamperini being fired by Sebastião José de Carvalho e Melo, 1st Marquis of Pombal, who further more banned women from performing on stage in Portugal. While the ban on women stage performers were on paper only in most of Portugal, it was enforced in the capital of Lisbon, where it was in force until Mariana Albani, Luisa Gerbini and Joaquina Lapinha were engaged at the Teatro Nacional de São Carlos in 1795.

After her dismissal, she resumed her career in Venice.
