= Sally K. Reeves =

American historian, translator, and archivist

Sally Kittredge Reeves (born 1942) is an American historian, translator, and archivist. She is known for her work in the New Orleans Notarial Archives as "Louisiana's premier archivist" and her publications on New Orleans history. She currently serves the Louisiana Historical Society as Archivist, Records Manager, and Assistant Treasurer.

== Education and personal life ==
Reeves is a native of New Orleans and remains involved with the community, beyond her retirement. She enjoys gardening, astronomy, and historical preservation, and often her publications reflect these interests. She attended Tulane University and the University of New Orleans.

== Career ==
Her career in archives spans over four decades. She has offered lectures for events and conferences throughout her career.

Since 1988, Reeves served as the Notarial Archivist for the New Orleans Archives and retired BEFORE 2008. The archives hold 5,000 pages of records from the French colonial era, 225,000 pages from when New Orleans was under Spanish rule, and hundreds of thousands from later eras to the present. On her role, Reeves stated, “When you’re entrusted with these records, part of your job is to let people know they exist and share this treasure with the public."

She has been part of the Louisiana Historical Society for decades. From 2003-2009, she served as society president and currently serves as Archivist, Records Manager and Assistant Treasurer.

=== Publications ===
Reeves has published articles through mediums including 64 Parishes, Preservation in Print, and others on topics relating to New Orleans.

- Legacy of a Century: Academy of the Sacred Heart in New Orleans
- New Orleans Architecture, Volumes IV, V, and VII, coauthor
- Historic City Park: New Orleans, coauthor
- Grand Isle of the Gulf: An Early History, coauthor
- Adrien Persac: Louisiana Painter, author of article
- “Glorious New Orleans Notarial Archives Gets New Housing,” Preservation In Print, June 1992
- “Notarial Archives Update,” Preservation in Print, March 1989
- Notable New Orleanians: A Tricentennial Tribute with Bill Reeves, 2018
- "Cruising Contractual Waters: Searching for Laffite in the Records of the New Orleans Notarial Archives", Journal of the Society of Georgia Archivists, 1998
- "Two Hundred Years of Maritime New Orleans: An Overview" with Bill Reeves in Tulane Maritime Law Journal, 2010
- Archival Evaluation of Floodwall Alignments, New Orleans, Louisiana. Historical Literature Review of Properties Affected By Corps Floodwall Alignments, Left Bank New Orleans (1983)
- Cultural Resources Investigations in the Vicinity of Fort Jackson, Plaquemines Parish, Louisiana: the Proposed Homeplace and Tropical Bend Borrow Areas (1988)
- Research Design for Cultural Resources Investigations in the Vicinity of Fort Jackson, Plaquemines Parish, Louisiana (1989)
- Tongue of Land Near La Fourche: the Archaeology and History of Golden Ranch Plantation, Lafourche Parish, Louisiana (1989)

=== Affiliations ===
- Serves on the board of the Southern Garden History Society
- Archivist, Records Manager, Assistant Treasurer for the Louisiana Historical Society
