= Marie Adrien Persac =

Franco-American artist and cartographer

- Born: December 14, 1823; Samur, France
- Died: July 21, 1873 (aged 49); Manchac, Louisiana, U.S.
- Resting place: Saint Joseph Catholic Cemetery, Baton Rouge, Louisiana, U.S.
- Other names: Adrien Persac, A. Persac
- Spouse: Marie Odile Daigre
- Children: 3

Marie Adrien Persac (December 14, 1823 – July 21, 1873) was a French-born American fine art painter, cartographer, photographer, and art teacher. Persac watercolored south Louisiana plantation houses and other aspects of the Southern landscape, and his work has much importance to Southern historians. His work was often signed, A. Persac.

== Early life ==
Marie Adrien Persac was born December 14, 1823, in Saumur, France to Pierre Edouard Persac and Pauline Sophie Marie Falloux. However the family perpetuated rumors of being from Lyon and it's possible he lived there briefly after leaving home. Between 1842 and 1850, he went to the United States. His educational background is unknown.

On December 8, 1851, he married Marie Odile Daigre, the daughter of a farmer in Baton Rouge and initially lived with her family in Manchac, Louisiana. Together they had three sons.

== Career ==
In 1856, Persac along with William G. Vail opened a daguerreotype photography studio on Florida Street in Baton Rouge. The daguerreotype photography studio did not last long, and Persac went on to work as an artist and lithographer for the press, Pessou and Simon (Louis Lucien Pessou and Benedict Simon). While working at the press he published Benjamin Moore Norman's 1858 lithograph Norman's Chart of the Lower Mississippi River, to which he added several illustrations.

In 1859 he moved to New Orleans and he remained in the south during the American Civil War (1861–1865). While in New Orleans he completed 43 property drawings between 1859 and 1869, and 21 drawings were collaborations with civil engineer Eugene Surgi (1826–1914) and they are used by the New Orleans Notarial Archives and Research Center.

In 1865 he opened a photography studio in New Orleans with a photographer named Legras. Within a year the photography studio was his own and was relocated to 130 Chartres Street. By 1867, his listed his profession in the New Orleans city directory as architect and moved his studio to 83 Exchange Place. Later his profession was listed in the city directory as artist, and by 1873 engineer.

In 1869, he founded a drawing and painting school, where he taught portrait and landscape painting in oil and watercolor.

He died on July 21, 1873, in Manchac, Louisiana, at the Daigre family house and he is buried at Saint Joseph Catholic Cemetery in Baton Rouge.

Persac's work is included in various public museum collections including Louisiana State Museum, Louisiana State University Museum of Art, among others.

== Images by Persac ==
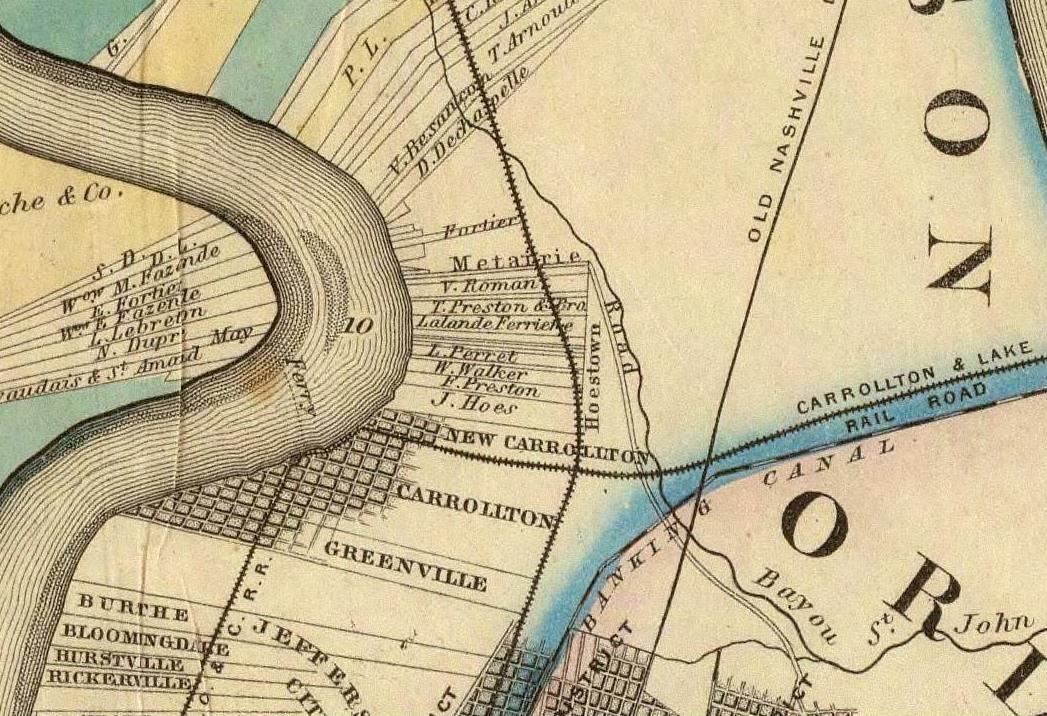

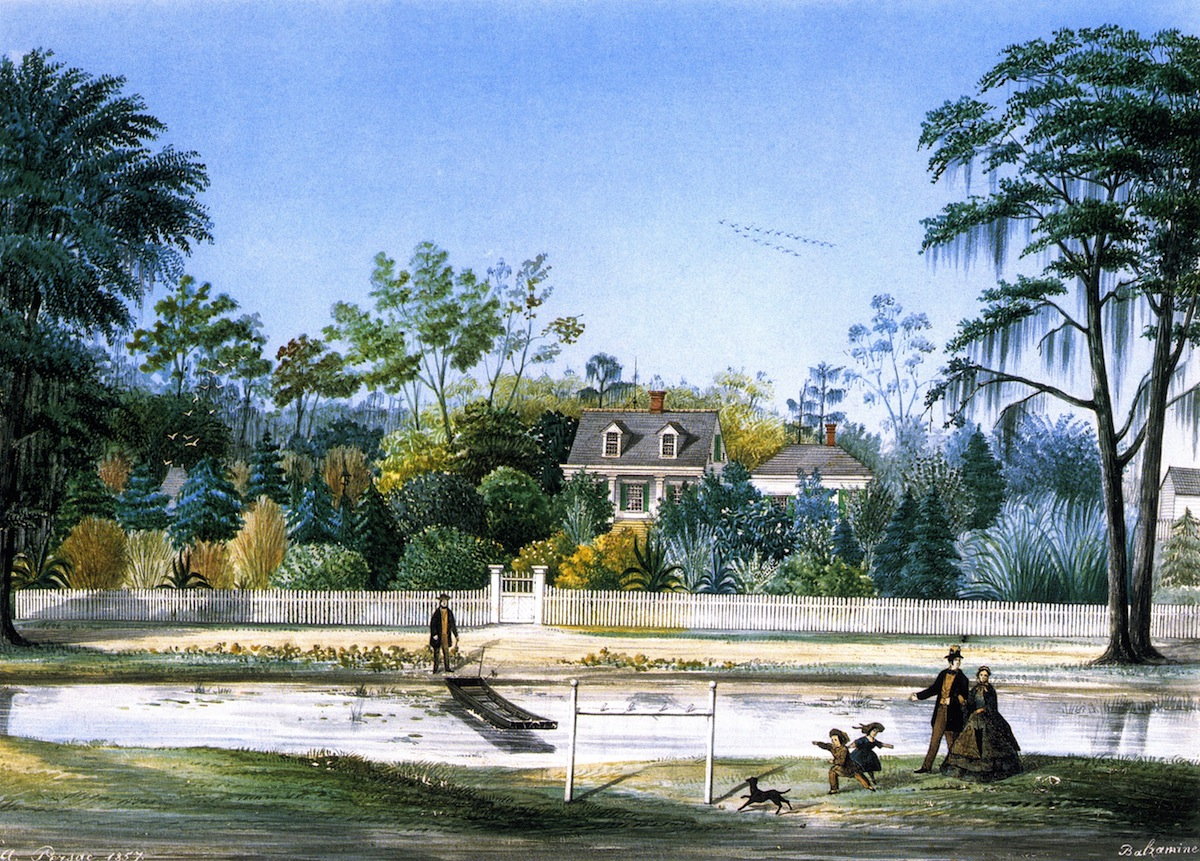

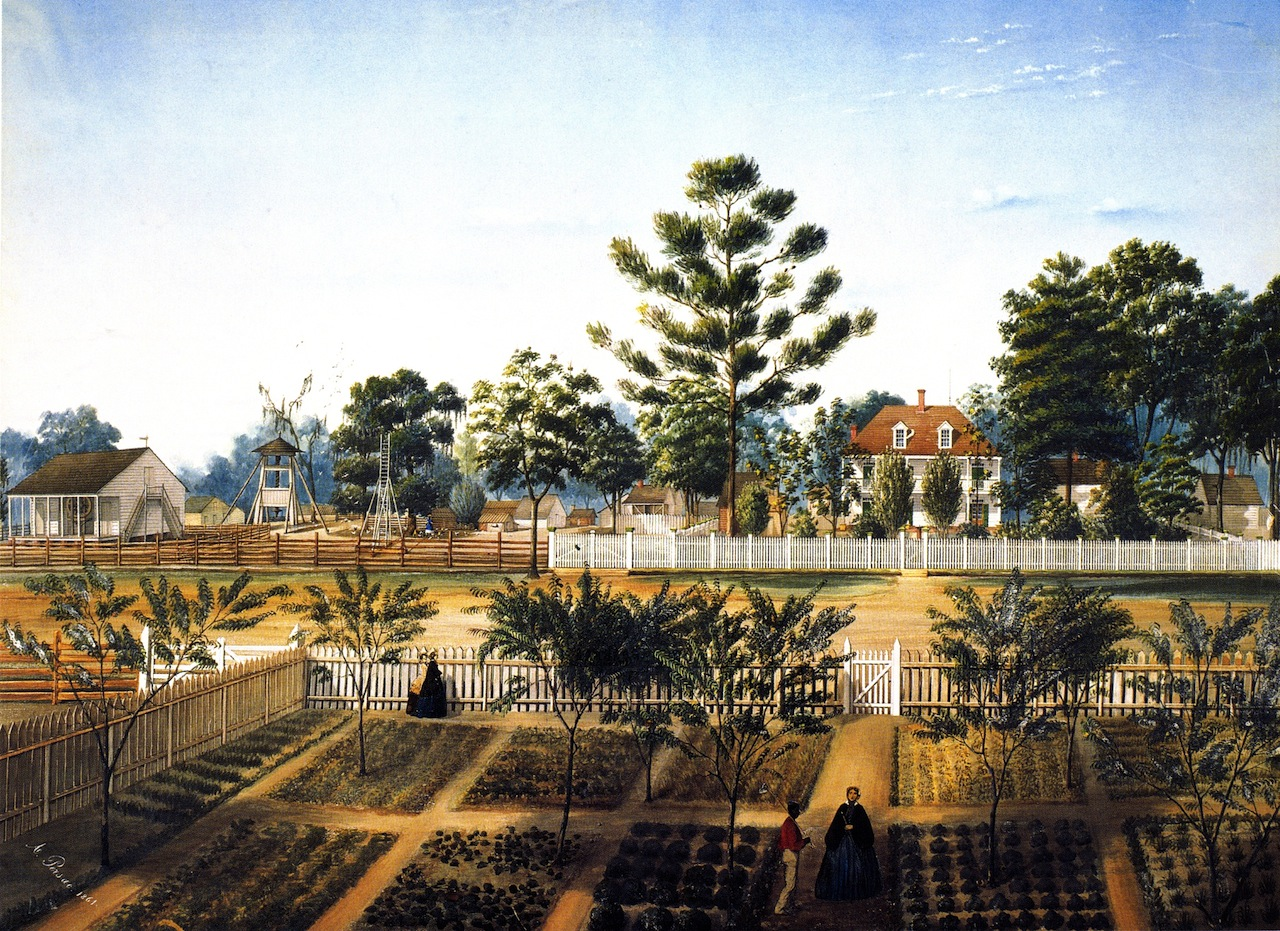

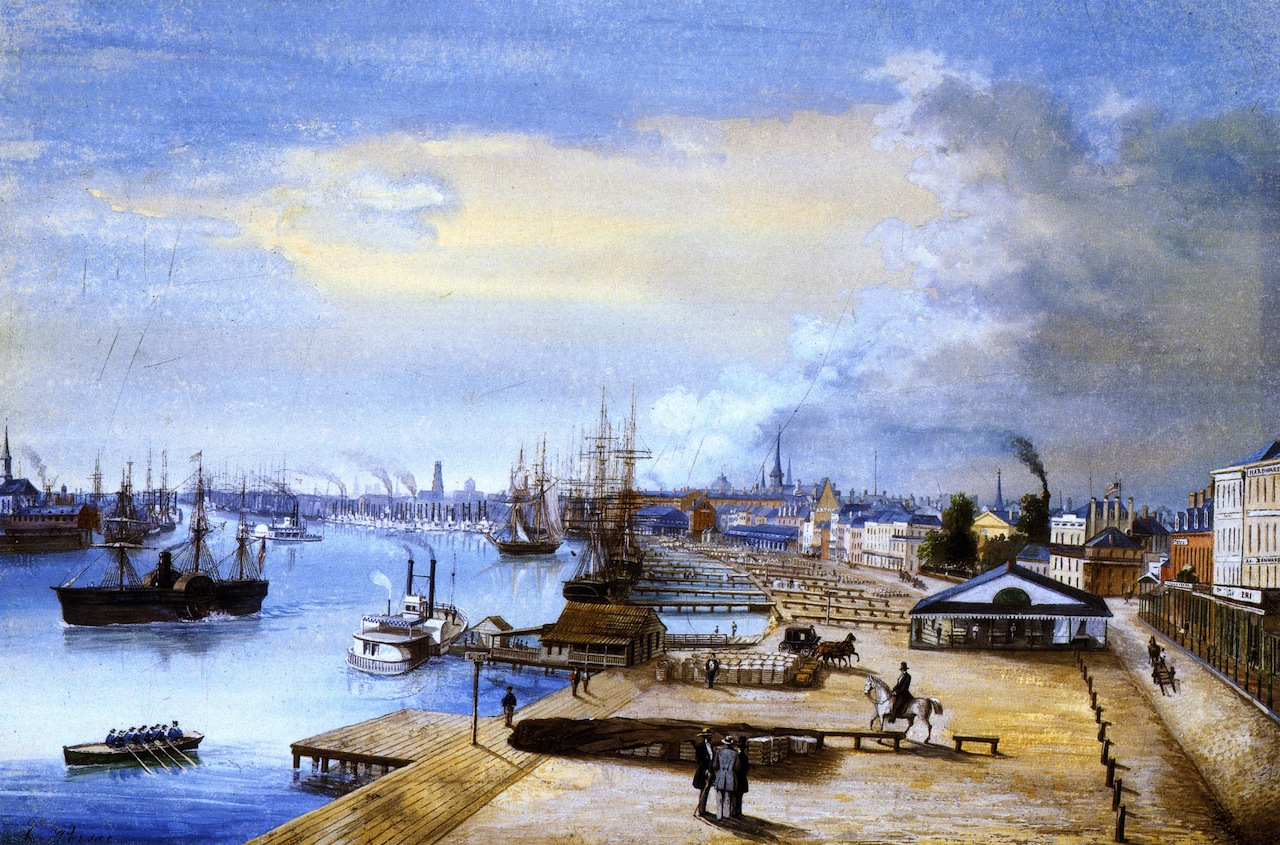

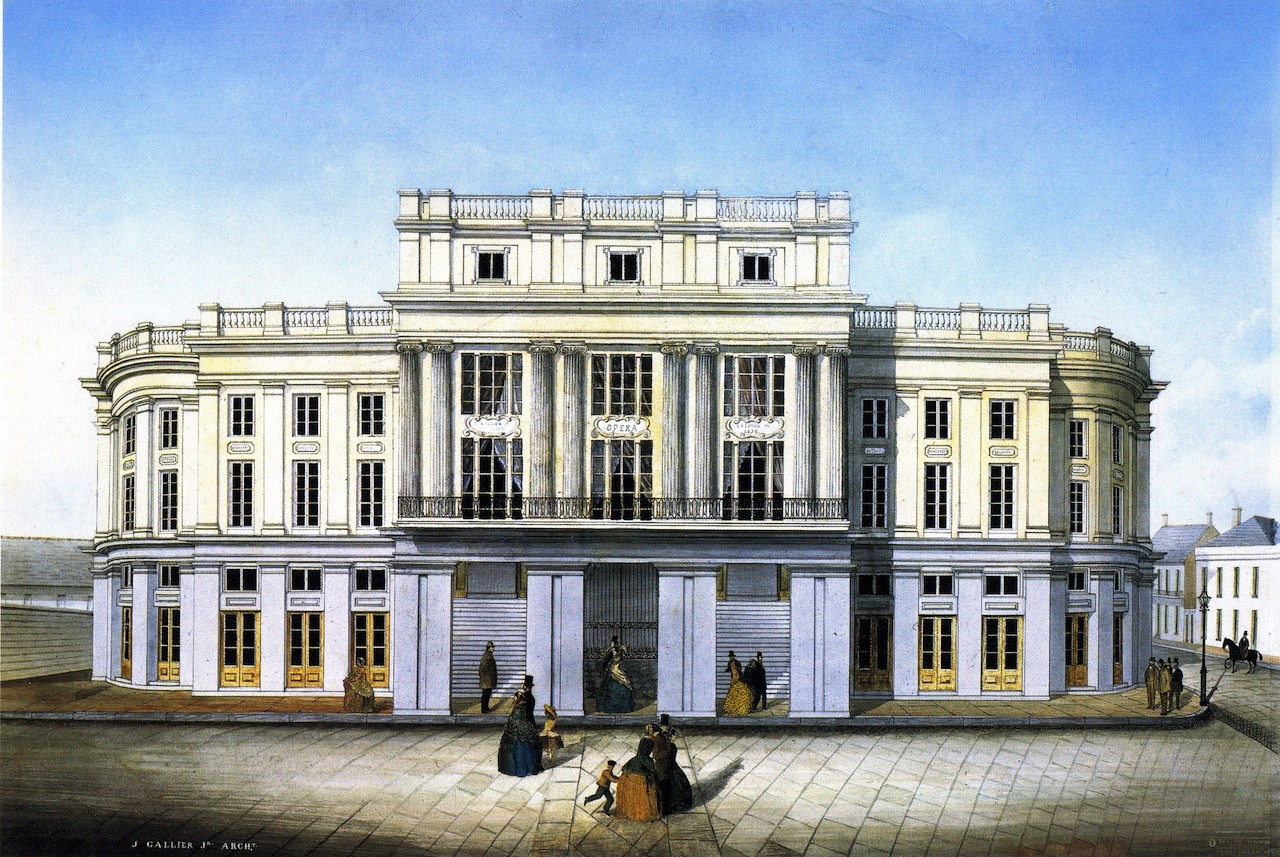
