= Théonie Rivière Mignot =

American restaurateur

Théonie Rivière Mignot (Philadelphia, 2 October 1819 – 13 December 1875, Greenwich, Fairfield, Connecticut), was an American businesswoman. From 1850 to 1861, she managed the famous restaurant The Mount Vernon in Charleston, South Carolina, known for the initiative of being the first public place in Charleston which explicitly catered to female customers.

== Life ==
Théonie Rivière Mignot was the daughter of Constance Alexandrine Angot (1790–1837) and the French baron Jean-Pierre Rivière (1770–1849), a refugee from the Haitian Revolution who established himself as merchant of luxury items in Charleston, South Carolina. She was educated in Paris. In 1834, she married Rémy Mignot (1801–1848), who founded the first French restaurant in Charleston, Coffee House vid 129 East Bay Street in 1837.

She actively participated in and helped run her husband's new store and café at 160 King Street when it first opened in 1842. The café became famous for its high quality and pastries. It served ice cream in the summer, which was an innovation at the time. In 1848, Théonie Rivière Mignot was widowed and took over the business formally and in her own name. She was one of the most successful businesswomen in Charleston alongside her rival Eliza Seymour Lee.

In 1850, she married the pastry chef Adolphus John Rutjes. They opened the famous restaurant The Mount Vernon, which became the perhaps most successful restaurant in Charleston. The restaurant included its own garden, where ice cream was served during the summer. During this time period, most public establishments was regarded to be foremost made for men, and The Mount Vernon was unusual as it specifically welcomed female customers. The Mount Vernon was destroyed during the fire of 1861. The Rutjes couple left Charleston for Columbia and then to Raleigh, where they kept an inn.
