= Joaquina Lapinha =

Joaquina Lapinha (born before 1786 – died after 1811) was an Afro-Portuguese (Brazilian) opera singer. She was the first Afro-American singer to have performed in Portugal and likely in Europe.

== Life ==
She was born in the Portuguese colony of Brazil and as such a Portuguese citizen. She belonged to the class of free people of color and was born free to the free colored woman Maria da Lapa.

She was engaged at the eldest Opera House in America, the Casa da Ópera de Vila Rica in the city of Vila Rica in Minas Gerais, which was managed by João de Souza Lisboa in 1770–1822. Free people of color were the most common category of people employed on stage in colonial Brazil at that time. She is known to have been active there in 1786, when she was engaged to perform at the festivities arranged in celebration of the royal marriage that year.

In 1791, she left Brazil for Portugal in the company of her mother and two female slaves. She made a successful tour as a singer in Portugal. She was the first woman of African heritage from the Americas to perform on stage in Portugal, and possibly in Europe.

At that time, women had formally been banned from performing onstage in Portugal since the dismissal of Anna Zamperini in 1774, although in practice, the ban was only enforced in the main capital of Lisbon. When the Teatro Nacional de São Carlos was inaugurated in Lisbon in 1793 however, there was a call for women to be allowed to perform onstage in the capital again. The ban was thus lifted, and in 1795 three women were engaged to perform at the Teatro Nacional de São Carlos: Mariana Albani, Luisa Gerbini and Joaquina Lapinha.

Lapinha had a successful career at the Teatro Nacional de São Carlos in Lisbon in 1795–1805. In 1805 she returned to Brazil, where she continued her career in Rio de Janeiro. In 1811, after the Portuguese royal family had fled to Brazil, she was chosen to perform for John VI of Portugal in Rio de Janeiro.
