= Ann Deas =

American hotelier

Ann Deas (fl. 1847) was an American hotelier. She was the owner and manager of the famous elite hotel Mansion House Hotel in Charleston, South Carolina between 1834 and 1847.

She was the daughter of Abigail Deas Jones and the stepdaughter of Jehu Jones Sr. (1769-1833). She was a member of the class of Free Colored in Charleston, South Carolina: both her mother and her stepfather had been slaves, but were manumitted in 1798. She was the half sister of Jehu Jones.

Her stepfather bought the Burrows-Hall House hotel in 1815, and developed it into the famous Jones Inn, one of the most successful hotels in Charleston, frequented by the rich white elite.

In 1833, her stepfather died. Her mother was by then already dead. Ann Deas took over the hotel of her stepfather in 1834. She managed it with great success and it continued to be one of the most elite hotels in Charleston. She renamed it the Mansion House Hotel. As was common for other Free Colored businesspeople, she used slave labour in her staff: in 1840, she is listed as the owner of five slaves working in her hotel.

She retired in 1847 and left the hotel to her former business associate Eliza A. Johnson.
