= Benjamin Moore Norman =

American book dealer and writer

- Born: December 22, 1809; Hudson, New York, US
- Died: February 1, 1860 (aged 50); Summit, Mississippi, US
- Occupations: Book dealer, writer

Benjamin Moore Norman (December 22, 1809 – February 1, 1860) was an American book dealer and writer who benefited from the success of John Lloyd Stephens's book, Incidents of Travel in Central America, Chiapas and Yucatán. He was a beneficiary of a public offer by the author to return to the Maya region and further his studies. He initiated, on his own and anticipating Stephens, a trip to the Yucatan Peninsula and wrote about it.

== Biography ==
=== Early life ===
Benjamin Moore Norman was born on December 22, 1809, in Hudson, New York to William E. Norman, local bookseller. When his father died, the younger Norman left his clerkship in New York City to take over the family bookstore. Shortly after, he left Hudson for Philadelphia, only to move to New Orleans in 1837, which would be his permanent home for the rest of his life.

=== Career ===
In December 1841, he had made progress on Stephen's by writing on the topic of the Maya Civilization in the Yucatán Peninsula. He traveled through the peninsula visiting Valladolid, Chichén Itzá, Uxmal, and San Francisco de Campeche. In this last location Norman was interviewed by Justo Sierra O'Reilly who, much later, characterized him in his newspaper, The Yucatán Register(vol 1, page 342), in the following way:

"Dressed in linen pants and jacket, putting on steel framed glasses and somewhat scrawny and sickly, as he is, he flew on wings of his avarice to the coasts of Yucatan...he returned to New York and published a book, Rambles in Yucatán which is the most foolish and ridiculous book we have read lately...his estimates were not unsuccessful though as the newly coined traveler won his 8 to 10,000 dollars, mocking the credulity of his readers."

In effect, after three months of travel through the Yucatán Peninsula Norman returned to New York where he edited and published his book in 1843. The encyclopedia, Yucatán in Time (page 363, vol. 4) says, in the biographical note containing this author, that later the historian Gustavo Martínez Alomía noted:

"...the recordings and lithographs (published in Norman's book) represent imaginary objects save those that he copied from the Stephens book which had motivated his travels. We know positively that Dr. Sierra thought of including a refutation of Norman's book, of which in the end, he ceased, because he would have needed to translate it in its entirety and he didn't believe that such a book deserved the honors of a translation nor even a refutation."

This is perhaps overly harsh, as there is no serious doubt Norman visited the sites in Yucatan. His writings however were not particularly insightful and his drawings of mediocre quality, both suffering from comparison to the much better documentation by John Lloyd Stephens and Frederick Catherwood. Norman's work was not entirely without interest, however; it contains the first published documentation of the ceramic figurines of Jaina Island.

Norman's "Rambles in Yucatan" had immediate success, five editions being printed, the last in 1849. Based on his success with it, Norman initiated a new series of travels that led him to Cuba and eventually to HuastecaTamaulipeca, producing another work entitled, Rambles by Land and Water or Notes of Travel in Cuba and Mexico, published in 1845.

From this last trip he brought to the United States a collection of archaeological pieces from Huasteca which were eventually donated to the Brooklyn Museum. The archeologist Herbert J. Spinden, in his monograph Huastec Sculpture and the Cult of Apotheosis, makes reference to the pieces and includes biographical dates of Norman.

=== Death ===
While traveling in Mississippi, Norman was struck with pneumonia, from which he died on February 1, 1860, in Summit, Mississippi.

== Works ==
- Rambles in Yucatan: Or, Notes of Travel through the Peninsula, Including a Visit to the Remarkable Ruins of Chi-Chen, Kabak, Zayi, and Uxmal (1843)
- Views of Ancient Monuments in Central America, Chiapas, and Yucatan (1844)
- Norman's New Orleans and Environs (1845)
- Rambles by Land and Water, or, Notes of Travel in Cuba and Mexico; Including a Canoe Voyage up the River Panuco, and Researches among the Ruins of Tamaulipas (1845)

== Gallery ==
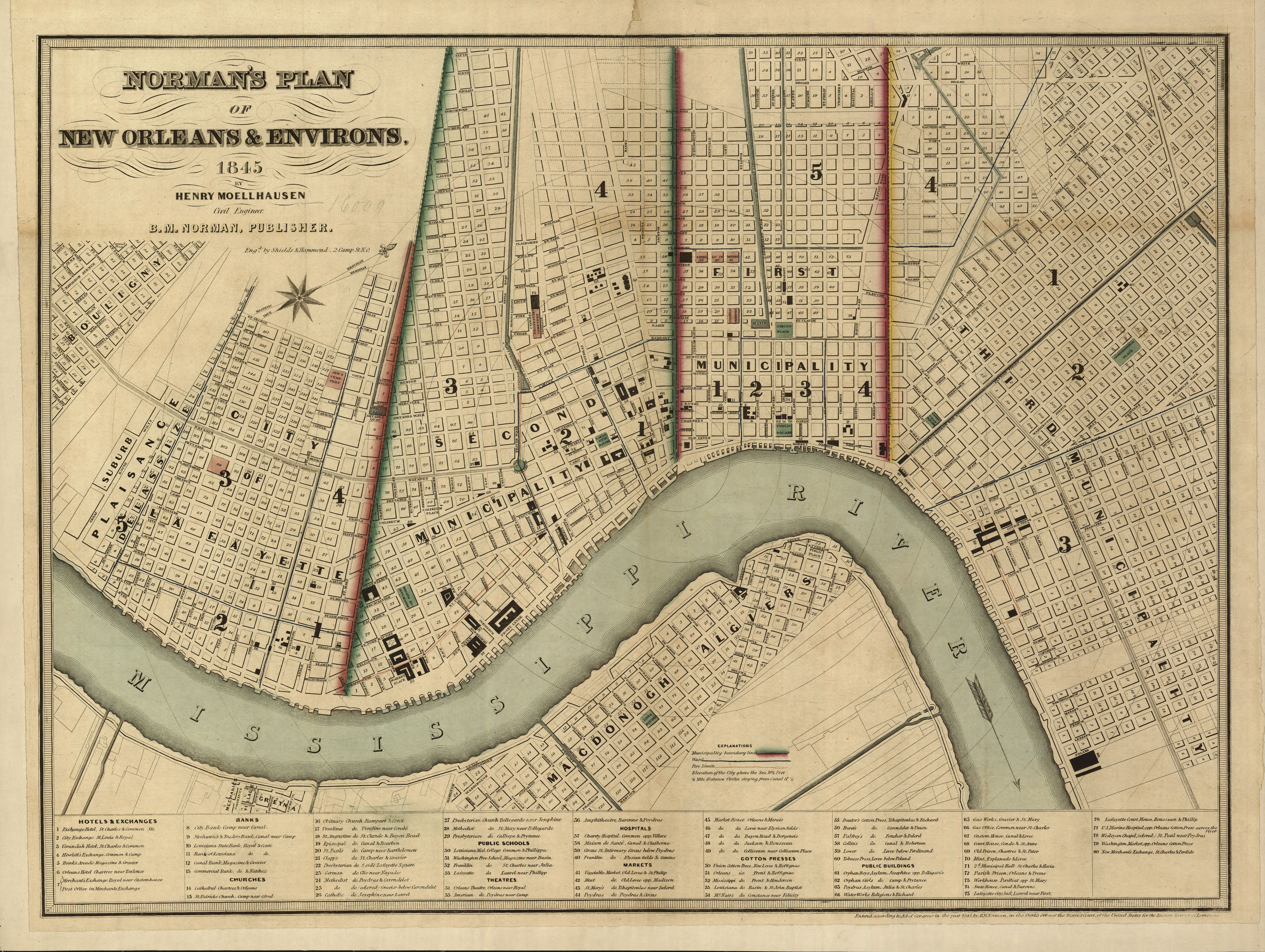
Norman's plan of New Orleans & environs, 1845

Norman's chart of the lower Mississippi River, 1858
