= Eliza Seymour Lee =

American pastry chef and restaurateur

Eliza Seymour Lee (c. 1800–1874), was an American pastry chef and restaurateur.

She was the daughter of pastry chef Sally Seymour. In 1823, she married the free African-American tailor John Lee (d. 1851).

In 1824, she inherited her mother's business and property, including a bakery and slave labor, and expanded it to eventually managing four restaurants in Charleston, South Carolina: The Mansion House on Broad Street (1840–1845), Lee House (1845–1848), Ann Deas' Jones Hotel (1848–1850) and Moultrie House on Sullivan’s Island (1850–1851). She and her husband owned several slaves of their own, and staffed their hotel with slave staff.

Her cuisine was so renowned that planters sometimes paid her to instruct their own enslaved cooks. She was one of the most successful businesswomen in Charleston alongside her rival Théonie Rivière Mignot. As her mother before her, she was often hired to cater private functions hosted by the private societies of the Charleston planter aristocracy, most notably the annual banquet of the South Carolina Jockey Club during race week. Her success was uncommon for a free coloured woman in Prewar South.

She retired in 1861.

== See also ==
- Aspasia Cruvellier Mirault
