= Mary Johnston Rose =

Jamaican hotelier (c.1718–1783)

Mary Johnston Rose (c. 1718 – 1783) was a Jamaican hotelier.

== Early life ==
Rose was born in St Catherine's Parish to Elizabeth Johnston (d. 1753), who was registered as a "free negro". Mary Rose is described as a "free mulatto". Her early life is not fully documented. Allegedly she was born a slave. Her father was white. Her mother was manumitted with her daughter by her owner and lover. He gave them property to provide for them. Mary Rose was apparently educated, and could read and write when this was not universal even for white women in Jamaica. As was common for free women of colour, she became the mistress—called "housekeeper"—of a white man, in her case Chief Justice of Jamaica Rose Fuller, who gave her an annuity when he left for Britain in 1754.

== Hotelier ==
Mary Rose became a rich and influential woman in Jamaica. She lived in the capital, Spanish Town, where she rented rooms to local politicians and officials who visited to attend the legislative assembly. In 1759, her hotel was described as the finest in Jamaica. She was influential since people used her as a channel to Rose Fuller. She owned several slaves, and gave one slave to each of her nieces and nephews.

In 1745, she petitioned for white status (with the rights associated with this status) for herself and her sons Thomas Wynter and William Fuller, and in 1746 the British Parliament confirmed the Act of the Jamaican Assembly:

“At the Court of St. James 17.12.1746. Present the King’s Most Excellent Majesty in Council. Whereas the Governor and Commander-in-Chief of His Majesty’s Island of Jamaica with the Council and Assembly of the said Island did in 1745 pass an Act which hath been transmitted in the words following viz An Act to Intitle Mary Johnston Rose of the Parish of St. Catherines in the said Island, a free mulatto woman and her sons Thomas Wynter and William Fuller begotten by white fathers to the same rights and privileges with English subjects born of white parents. The Act was confirmed, finally enacted and ratified accordingly.”

Her petition was likely approved because the two white fathers of her two sons were members of the Jamaican Assembly. This was not uncommon for the small class of well-connected free people of color of 18th-century Jamaica, but this custom was banned by the Jamaican Assembly in 1761.

She belonged to the small but privileged class of free people of colour on Jamaica. Her correspondence with Rose Fuller from the years 1756–1760 is preserved.
