= Louis Lucien Pessou =

American printmaker (1824–1886)

- Born: May 14, 1824; New Orleans, Louisiana, U.S.
- Died: December 18, 1886 (aged 62); Orleans Parish, Louisiana, U.S.
- Occupations: Lithographer, press owner
- Spouse: Amelie "Amelia" Henriette Colin (m. 1865)
- Children: 2

Louis Lucien Pessou (May 14, 1824 – December 18, 1886) was an American lithographer, and "free man of color" in New Orleans, Louisiana. He co-owned the press Pessou & Simon (1853–1867), and Pessou & Krauss (1868).

== Life and career ==
Louis Lucien Pessou was born May 14, 1824, in New Orleans, Louisiana. His parents Maria Magdalene Hernandez and Joseph Alphonse "Antoine" Pessou were free Saint-Domingue Creoles, who had immigrated from Saint-Domingue (now Haiti) during the St. Domingue Revolution. His father was a gunsmith.

Pessou was married to Amelie "Amelia" Henriette Colin in 1865. Together they had two children.

He co-owned the lithography printing press Pessou & Simon (1853–1867), with German immigrant Benedict Simon; and Pessou & Krauss (1868), with German immigrant William Krauss. Pessou & Simon were the first in the city to develop color lithography, which was used for maps, architectural plans, book illustrations, city views, and business papers.

In 1868, Pessou was named the Orleans Parish recorder of births and deaths, and later marriages too.

Pessou died on December 18, 1886, in Orleans Parish, Louisiana.
