= Maria Vlier =

Dutch Surinamese teacher and history textbook author

- Born: Maria Louisa Elisabeth Vlier; 19 March 1828; Paramaribo, Dutch colony of Suriname, Kingdom of the Netherlands
- Died: 8 June 1908 (aged 80); Paramaribo, Dutch colony of Suriname, Kingdom of the Netherlands
- Occupation: teacher
- Years active: 1848–1908
- Known for: publishing the first history textbook on Suriname
- Notable work: Beknopte geschiedenis der kolonie Suriname (Brief history of the Suriname colony, 1863)

Maria Vlier (19 March 1828 – 8 June 1908) was a Dutch Surinamese teacher who wrote the first history textbook focused on the history of Suriname. Born into an intellectual family who descended from slaves, Vlier was educated in the Netherlands and returned to Suriname to teach. Recognizing that students were being taught European history and had no knowledge of the history of their own homeland, she wrote the first textbook on the colony. The book won a silver medal at the International Colonial and Export Exhibition of 1883 and was one of the three most-used textbooks in the Surinamese education system until 1945.

== Early life ==
Maria Louisa Elisabeth Vlier was born on 19 March 1828 in Paramaribo in the Dutch colony of Suriname of the Kingdom of the Netherlands to Anna Elisabeth Heuland and Nicolaas Gerrit Vlier. Along with her younger sister, Cornelia Philippina Maria Josephina (1834–1892), Vlier grew up in an intellectual family. Descended of slaves, her father served as a prosecutor and owned two coffee plantations, Morgenster and La Prevoyance which he worked with his own slave labor, before becoming police chief of Paramaribo in 1832. Between 1832 and 1848, Vlier's father became a secretary of the Particuliere West-Indische Bank and overseer of six coffee, one cotton, and six sugar plantations. Her mother was a former slave, having gained her manumission in 1816. The couple and their daughters were part of the small black professional middle class.

Vlier attended the school operated by a former slave, Johanna Christina Jonas. Jonas had been educated in the Netherlands and opened a school, which had no class or racial barriers, upon gaining her own freedom. Vlier was a good student and in 1838 was recognized with an award for her scholastic achievements. In 1844, her father took her to study in the Netherlands. She had a broad knowledge of languages, which included Volapük. After completing her studies, Vlier passed her teacher's examination in 1848.

== Career ==
Vlier opened a girls' school and began teaching. She moved into a house on Gravenstraat, one of the most prestigious addresses in Paramaribo. Alarmed at the lack of knowledge her students had of their homeland, she began drafting the first history of the colony. In the preface of the book, probably written in 1861 1861, (Note: Steven Hagers notes that the period of time that Vlier worked on the book is unknown, but he affixed the date 1861 to the preface, as in that year the abolitionist Julien Wolbers published Geschiedenis van Suriname (History of Suriname) with the publisher H. de Hoogh, who would later publish Vlier's textbook. Passages in Wolbers' book appear to have been reproduced identically from Vlier's manuscript, especially her text on her father. Ellen Neslo noted that Vliers had access to records of the Departement Paramaribo der Maatschappij: Tot Nut van't Algemeen (Paramaribo departmental society for the common benefit), known as the Nut, through her father and uncle's membership in the society. She was also part of the black elite, knew many society notables, and may have been able to use archives from her great-grandparents' publishing business. Hagers commented that Wolbers, had never been to Suriname and developed his book to argue for the abolition of slavery.) she stated that her motivation for writing was that school children of Suriname knew more about the history of foreigners than they did of Suriname. Though Vlier wrote about the slave trade in her textbook Beknopte geschiedenis der kolonie Suriname voor de meer gevorderde jeugd (Brief history of the Suriname colony for more advanced youth, 1863), she was cautious with the topic. She called the trade in Africans "illegal", but was aware of the negative impact on the career of Johannes Christiaan Palthe Wesenhagen, another free black who had written about slavery in 1849. Her book contains little criticism of the Netherlands and did not write about oppression of the colonized under Dutch rule. Overall the book has a positive characterization of Dutch administration and became one of the three most-used textbooks in the education system until 1945.

In 1881, Vlier published a revised edition, calling it Geschiedenis van Suriname (History of Suriname), including the 1863 abolition of slavery, which had not been included in the first volume. Two years later, when the International Colonial and Export Exhibition was held at the site of the Museumplein in Amsterdam, Vlier sent a copy of her second edition textbook to be judged for the prizes in the historical documents competition. One of 42 submissions in the category, along with Wolbers history, she took the 2nd place silver medal behind Michael Théophile Hubert Perelaer's gold medal for his article on military operations at Celebes in 1858 and 1860. Vlier was not in the Netherlands to personally receive her award, but she traveled to Amsterdam in 1892, where she remained for two years before returning to Suriname.

== Death and legacy ==
Vlier died in Paramaribo on 8 July 1908. At the centennial of her birth in 1928, she was honored for her contributions to the historiography of Suriname, but her history of being part of the black community had been erased. She was depicted as Dutch with parents of European descent. In 2011, Vlier's life story was included in the book 1001 vrouwen in de 20ste eeuw (1001 Women in the 20th Century) by Els Kloek as well as in the exhibit of the same name and based upon figures in the book, hosted by the Amsterdam Museum in 2018. Consulting experts to determine which historic Dutch women from the Dutch Antilles, Indonesia, and Suriname should be included in the work. Kloek worked as a guest curator to co-assemble exhibition, which began with Vlier's life story.
