= Aspasia Cruvellier Mirault =

American planter and landowner

Aspasia Cruvellier Mirault (c. 1800 – 1857) was an American entrepreneur and landowner. She managed to acquire land in the city of Savannah in Georgia, despite the prohibition against landowning in Antebellum Savannah for non-white people.

== Biography ==
Aspasia Cruvellier Mirault born a free person of color in the French colony of Saint Domingue. She was the daughter (or younger sister) of Hagar Cruvellier (fl. 1823) and the sister of Francis, Peter and Justine Cruvellier. She emigrated with her family to Savannah as a child. From 1812, she lived in Savannah, Georgia, where her family established a successful tailor shop.

She initially worked in the family tailor workshop with her family as a seamstress. In 1825, she opened a bakery and pastry shop with her sister Justine. She became a very successful businesswoman. She married Samuel Mirault, with whom she had the daughters Louisa and Letitia. She was widowed in 1829 or 1831. By that time, she owned her own pastry shop. Like her mother and her sister, she used slave labour in her business: in 1839, she paid taxes for five female slaves.

In 1842, she became a landowner when she bought a lot of land in the city of Savannah, auctioned by the city authorities. In 1818, non-white people were forbidden by law to buy land in the city of Savannah. However, it was common for wealthy Afro Americans in Savannah to get around the law by using a white representative to buy the land for them. Aspasia Cruvellier Mirault used the services of George Cally, who bought the land in his own name using her money. Formally, Cally was the owner of the land, but in reality, Cally and Cruvellier Mirault had an agreement in which the land was to be owned by her in all but name, and it appears that Cally respected the agreement. Cruvellier Mirault had a house built on her land which she used to expand her business and provide her family - children and grandchildren - with larger living space.

== Personal life ==
Mirault was Catholic.

== See also ==
- Eliza Seymour Lee
