= Jaina Island =

Archaeological site in Campeche, Mexico

Coordinates: 20°12′30″N 90°29′9″W

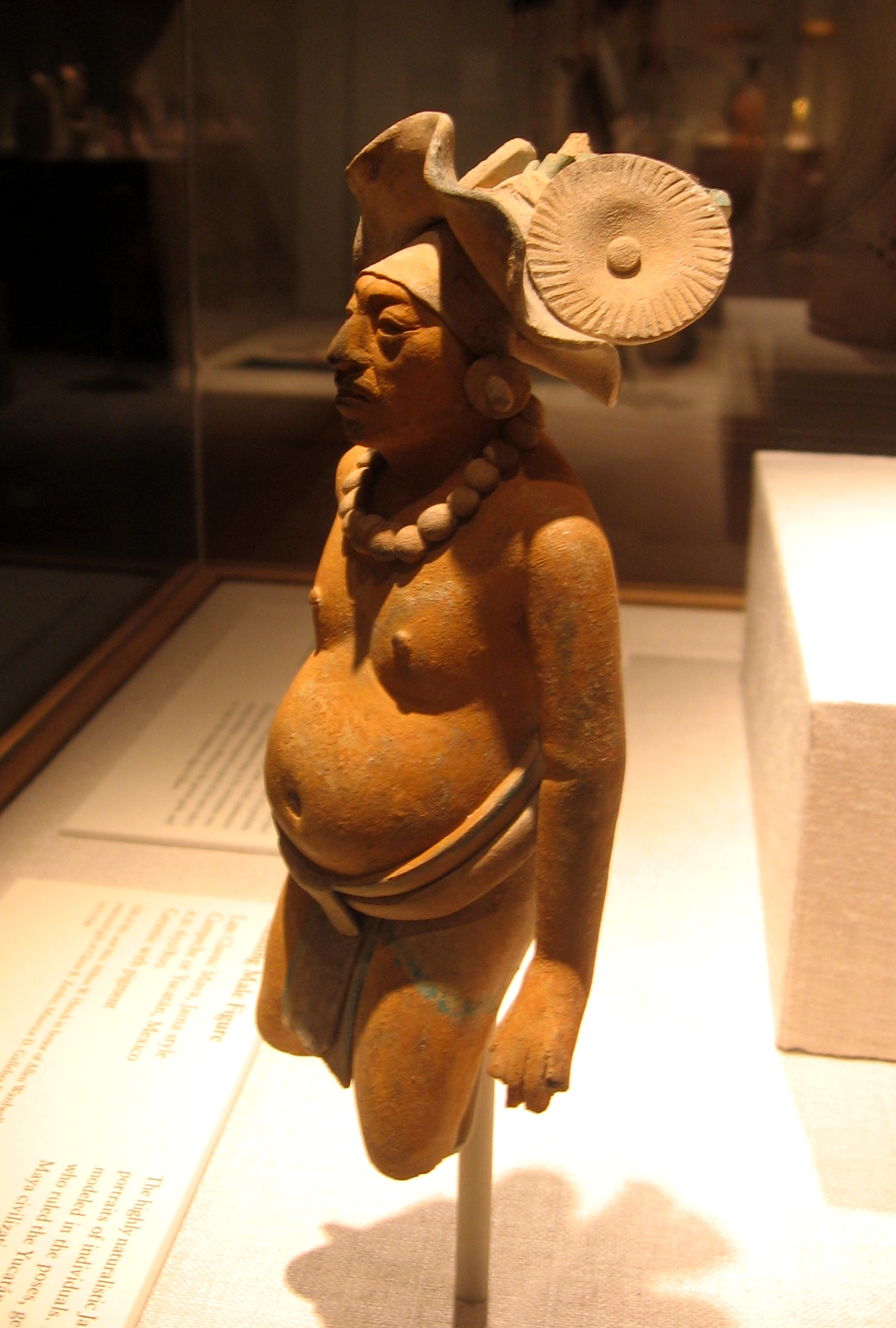
Handcrafted male figurine, 650–800 AD.

Jaina Island is a pre-Columbian Maya archaeological site and artificial island in the present-day Mexican state of Campeche. A small limestone island on the Yucatán Peninsula's Gulf coast with only a tidal inlet separating it from the mainland, Jaina served as an elite Maya burial site, and is notable for the high number of fine ceramic figurines excavated there.

The term "Jaina" translates to "Temple in the Water".

== The site ==
Jaina Island and other major Classic Era Maya communities.

Both Jaina Island and nearby Piedras Island (Isla Piedras) were the sites of small towns or villages. Jaina was settled c. 300 CE, lasting until its abandonment some time circa 1200 CE. The principal occupation occurred near the end of this period, during the Late Classic and Terminal Classic eras. Present-day ruins consist of two small plaza groups and a ballcourt.

Jaina Island's notability is tied to its estimated 20,000 graves, of which over 1,000 have been archaeologically excavated. Within each grave, the human remains are accompanied by glassware, slateware, or pottery as well as one or more ceramic figurines, usually resting on the occupant's chest or held in their hands.

The name of this island necropolis probably comes from the Yucatán Maya phrase hail na, or “watery house”. Its western location may have been tied to the setting sun, and therefore to death.

The source of the burial population is as yet unknown, but likely comes from Edzna, and the nearby Chenes and Puuc regions.

== Jaina style figurines ==
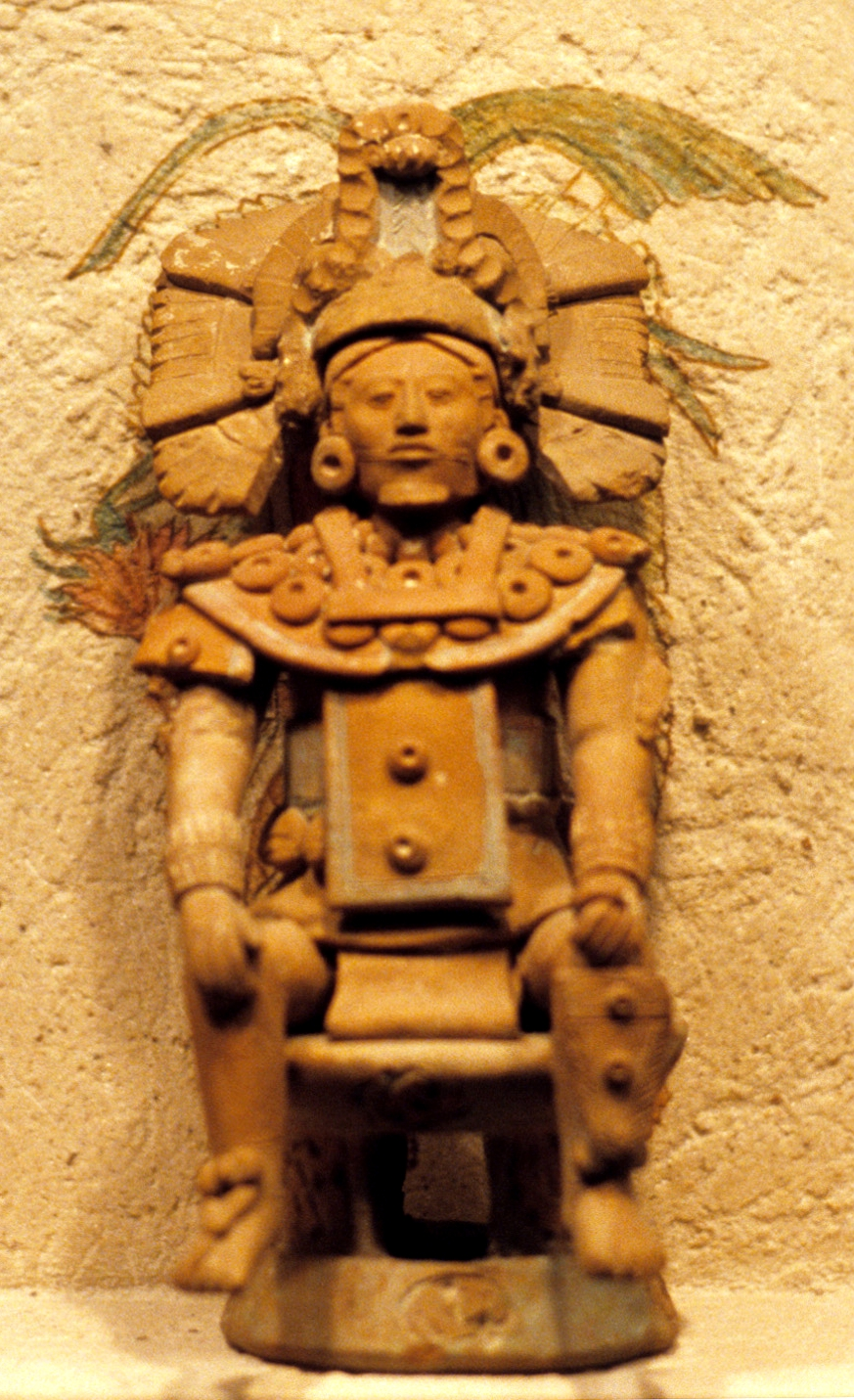
Handcrafted male figurine.

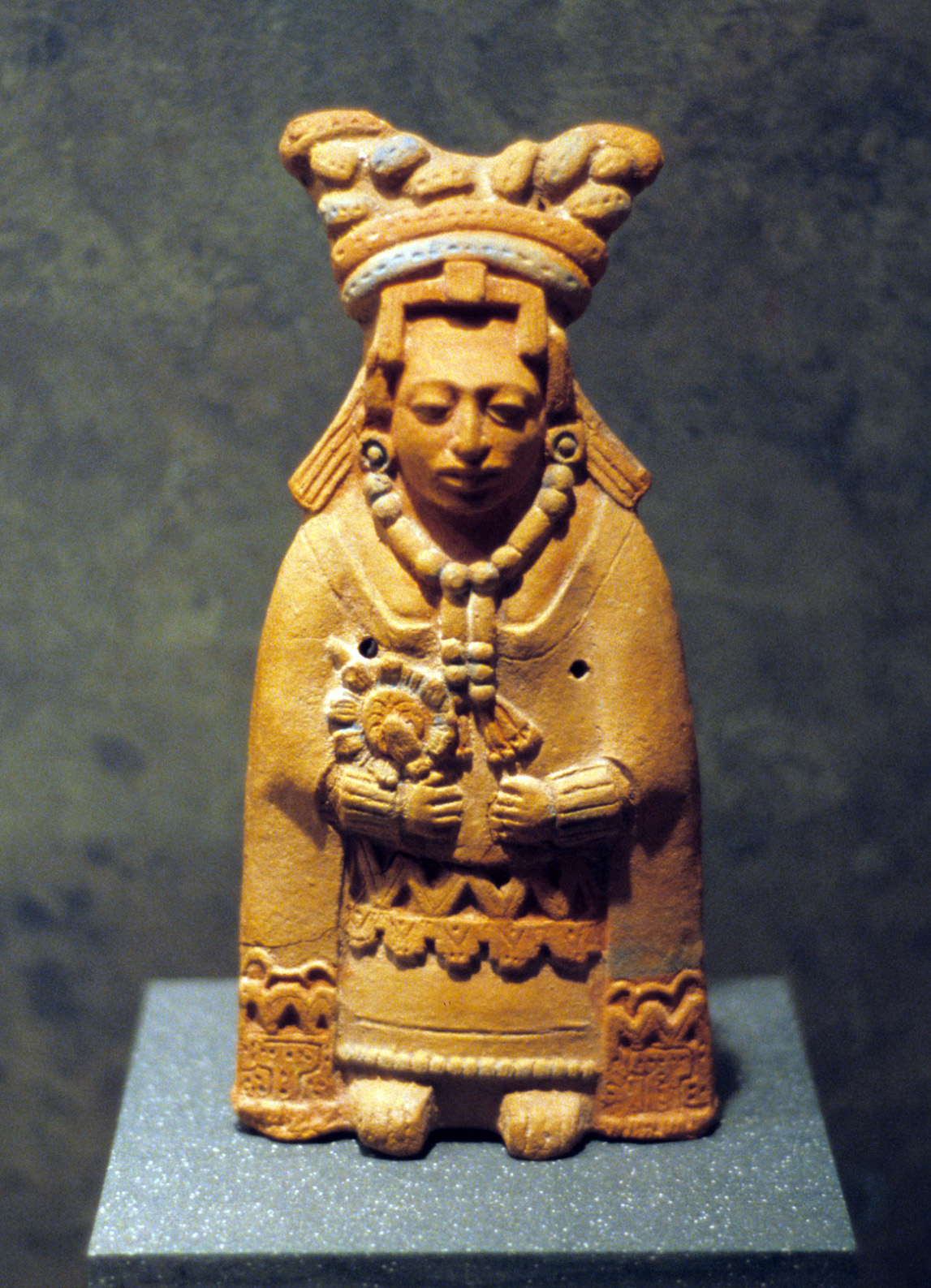
Molded female figurine.

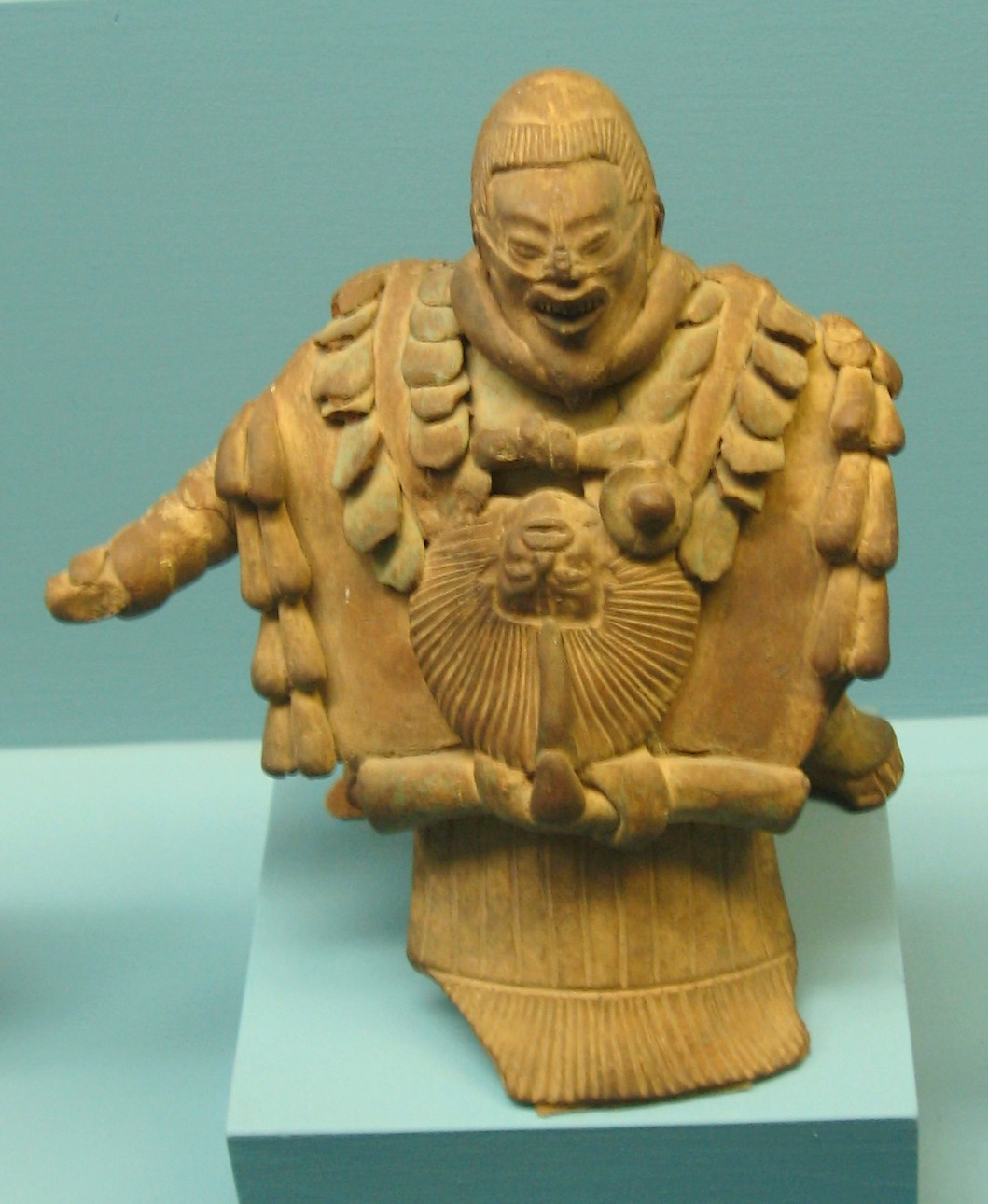
Handcrafted male figurine.

Due to sheer numbers found here, these figurines have become known as "Jaina-style figurines" whether or not they were found on the Jaina Island. In fact, these figurines are far more numerous at inland Maya sites, such as the Usumacinta River delta, than on the island.

Early Jaina-style figures are naturalistic, delicately detailed, and "generally regarded as the finest figurine art produced throughout the ancient Americas". While both solid and hollow figurines have been found, the latter predominate and are usually fitted with a whistle, or with clay pellets that produce a rattle-like sound. Like the figurines themselves, it is not known what function(s) the whistles and rattles served.

Made of orange clay and originally painted, mostly in ochres and blues, the figurines are generally 10 - 25 inches (25 – 65 cm) tall, rarely more.

These figures also represent Mayan practices of scarification and the significance of class in Mayan society. Details such as marks on the figure's face as well as clothing and jewelry can be used to signify social status of the figure.

All the figurines on Jaina Island seem to have been produced specifically as burial accompaniments. Due, if nothing else, to space considerations, few if any of these figurines could have been produced on the island itself. Many of the molded figurines have been linked to workshops at Jonuta, some distance to the south and west.

Created in a realistic style, the figurines are an ethnographic treasure trove, affording a glimpse into the physical features, dress, and daily life of the late Classic Maya elite. Their delicate detail reveals hallmarks of social status and the figurines are often shown with tools and other accoutrements, providing us three-dimensional snapshots of long-vanished implements.

=== Portraiture? ===
The idiosyncratic details shown in the earlier phase figurines have led one researcher to declare that they are "genuine essays in portraiture", while another adds that the figurines "faithfully describe age, status, and expression". Expressive and individual as they are, it has thus far proven to be difficult to determine the subjects of these figurines.

For example, it is not possible to correlate the figurines with their associated burial. In particular, the sex of the figurines only randomly seem to match the sex of the burial—female figurines may accompany male burials and vice versa, while child burials are often accompanied by adult figurines.

Certain figurines, and styles of figurines, have been identified as deities. Others hint at myths or legends. It has also been suggested that the figurines represent ancestors, distant or immediate. The question of portraiture may only be resolved when the function of these grave goods is itself resolved.

=== Chronological phases ===
In a 1975 article, Christopher Corson posited three phases based on the figurines' craftsmanship and production method:

Phase I AD 600 – 800
Phase II AD 800 – 1000
Campeche phase AD 1000 – 1200

While proposed dates vary considerably from researcher to researcher, such a division is useful for analyzing the changes in production methods and perhaps the cultural changes behind these.

Almost all Phase I figurines are hand-modeled, with pigment applied after the clay had dried, and show the greatest degree of craftsmanship. While certain recurring subjects and styles can be identified, there is a widespread uniqueness to the figurines from this phase.

Phase II is marked by the creation of figurines from molds. Often these molded figurines would be enhanced through incisions or the addition of thin clay strips and adornments. While casting increases productivity—no doubt at least a partial explanation for its adoption—it decreases artistic opportunities, and so Phase II figurines are generally less innovative, less detailed, and less idiosyncratic than those of Phase I.

The Campeche Phase was marked by the almost complete adoption of molded figurines, often whitewashed, preponderantly featuring a standing woman with upraised arms. This subject, variously identified with the goddesses Xochiquetzal or, mistakenly, Ix Chel, is so prevalent during this phase that it outnumbers all other subjects combined, suggesting that burial practices had come under the influence of a new, perhaps imported, ideology. (See examples of a Jonuta Campeche phase figurine and a Jaina Campeche phase figurine).

== Gallery ==
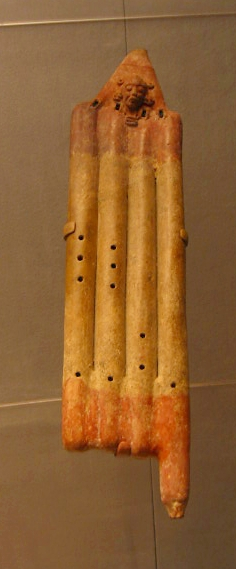
A ceramic flute. Note the miniature head.

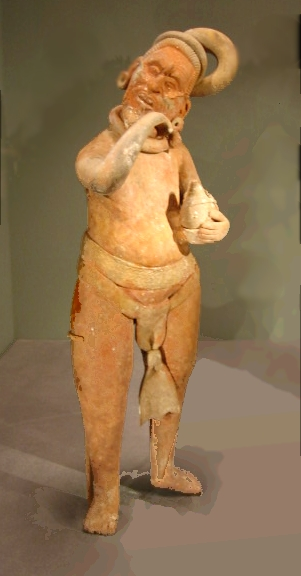
A drunkard, 400–800 AD.

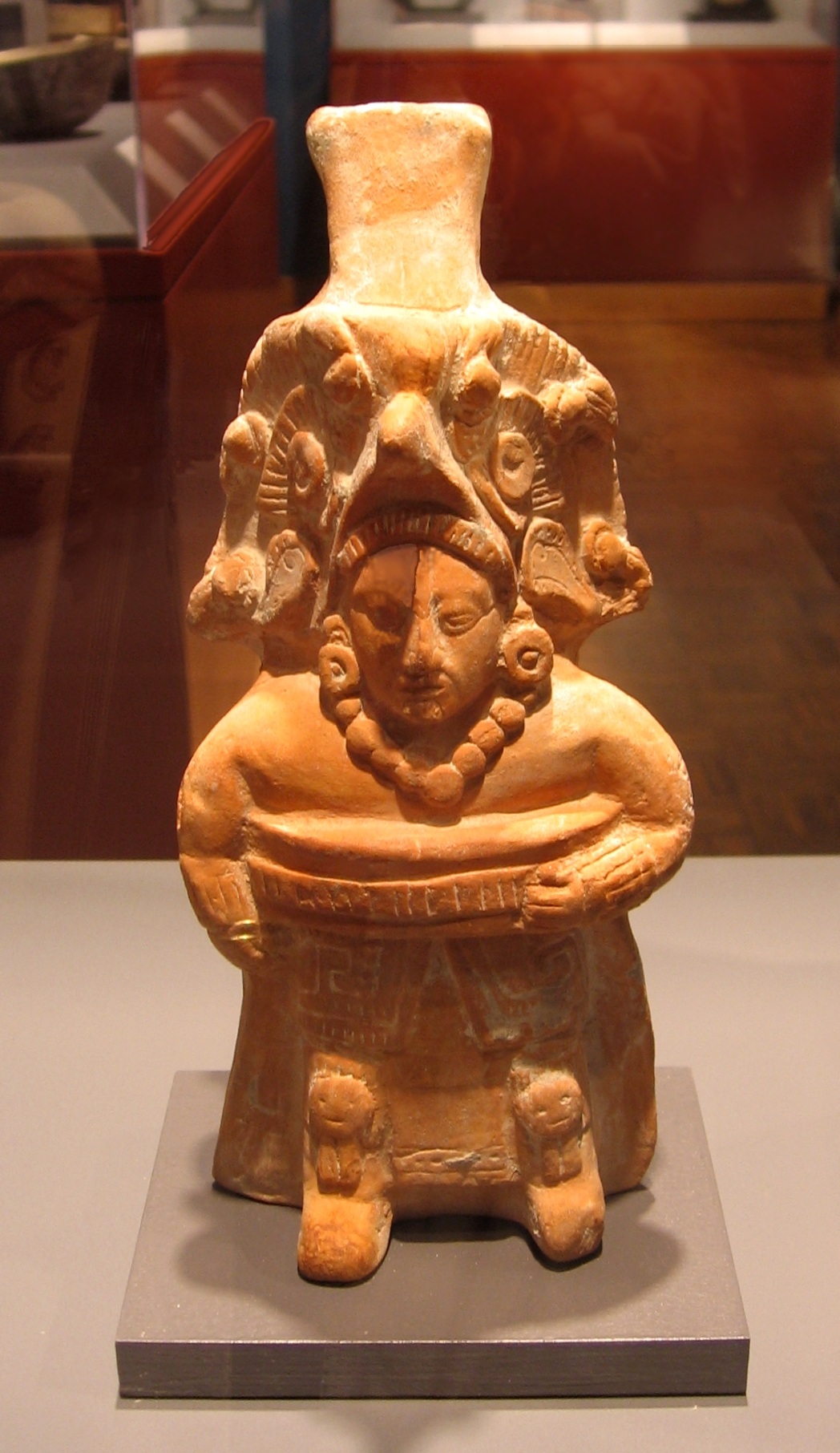
The yoke and kneepads identify this molded ceramic figurine as a ballplayer. Like many, it also functions as a whistle. 600–900 AD.
