= Luiga Gerbini =

Signora Luiga Gerbini (c. 1770- c. 1818) was an Italian violinist and singer from Turin. As a pupil of Gaetano Pugnani and Giovanni Battista Viotti, her playing was virtuosic.

== Life and career ==
The first decade of her career she was active as a soprano, but made less of an impact compared to her violin playing. She presumably gave her debut in 1790 in the Theater of Gorizia, Italy. In November of that year, she performed at the Paris Théâtre du Monsieur, where she sang and played the violin in between acts. The next year 1791 she was active in another Parisian theater, the Théâtre Feydeau, from 1794-96 she performed in Italy at the Florentine Teatro della Pergola at the opera and 1794 with singing and violin playing at La Scala in Milan. The next year she returned as singer and violinist in Livorno (Leghorn), Rome, and Naples. After such shows, she returned to Madrid in 1801 as a violinist, then back to London also as a violinist.

Luiga Gerbini was criticized for the instrument she played at the time, for it was socially undesirable for a woman to perform violin in public. In a letter to the editor of “Newcastle Weekly Chronicle”, it read “It is unseemly as well as uncommon to behold a female playing the violin and prejudice will operate, along with her other defects, to prevent her retaining the good opinion of the public”. Although there were those who critiqued her for playing the violin as a woman, there were those who were amazed by Gerbiini’s excellent performance: “[Gerbini] whose extraordinary power of the bow, whose strength in passagework and technical difficulty ascends nearly to the unbelievable for the lady’s chamber”.

The journal article, "Les Débuts de Viotti comme directeur de l'Opéra en 1819" records "This interlude or pasticcio had been the arranged debut of Signora Gerbini, who, despite her very beautiful voice, was stiff and a little awkward. But, and here's where the story gets worse: Gerbini had two strings to her bow, and the singer from a skilled violinist: She did much better on the violin. We applauded her loudly in a charming manner".

Salons and benefit concerts were common at the time, and she appeared in many as there are still concert tickets that are preserved. As a violinist, she toured in 1807. She played in Vienna, then the next year in Milan. She also went to Paris in 1811 and Belgium in 1815.

18th century, England had a frame that women were expected to be in: she was not allowed to upstage a man, and she could only play socially approved instruments such as the harpsichord, fortepiano, harp, or sing. Despite this, Gerbini as a strong violinist knew how to maintain a stage career, tour, and display herself to many parts of Europe.
